This is a list of characters who appear in RWBY, an original anime-style CG-animated web series created by Rooster Teeth Productions. According to series creator Monty Oum, every character's name is tied to a specific color. There are also other teams with their name combining to form acronyms that are also tied to a color.

Creation and conception

Oum designed the characters with assistance from artist Ein Lee. Oum had been browsing Lee's DeviantArt work and asked if she wanted to do some designs. The only rule provided for the series was "everyone must be badass." Lee also said that some of the characters were conceived between her and Oum, where he would provide a description followed by her sketching some ideas, or vice versa. Others were from brainstorming with other people. The characters utilize designs inspired by classic fairy tale characters. Each character has an associated color, and it is the first letters of these colors, red, white, black, and yellow, that give the series its name. Lee said that looking to people, Google image searches, and fashion were inspirations: "how people dress−down to the littlest detail—gives many subtle (and some not so subtle) hints about who they are. It’s all about giving the characters a unique and memorable look that people can still identify with." Oum also drew inspiration from the Final Fantasy video games and the "ridiculously obnoxious weapons".

The series was written by Oum, along with fellow Rooster Teeth employees Miles Luna and Kerry Shawcross. Oum was initially concerned about a story focusing on female characters being developed by a primarily male crew, but said they managed to do well developing the female characters.

Main characters

Team RWBY
Team RWBY (pronounced "ruby") is composed of four female students from Beacon Academy. Each member is associated with a color and alludes to a character in the fairy tale world—reflected in their names and personalities.

Ruby Rose 

 Voiced by: Lindsay Jones / Saori Hayami

The 15-year old main protagonist who uses a scythe called Crescent Rose as both a melee weapon and as a high caliber sniper rifle. In Volume 7, the blade of the scythe can now rotate on the rifle. Her Semblance is called "Petal Burst", which enables her to transform into a fast burst of rose petals. Initially, it was thought that Ruby's ability was primarily speed, enabling her to run faster than the human eye can catch, and change directions in mid-air. But in Volume 8, Penny explains that Ruby's Semblance is traveling at extreme velocities while breaking herself down to her molecular components to negate her mass, and then reassembling herself at the destination. She can also use her Semblance on others. In the finale of Volume 3, Ruby learns from Qrow that she and her mother are descendants of powerful silver-eyed warriors whom the Grimm long feared, since the warriors can tap into the God of Light's power to inflict harm on the Grimm in various ways.

As her mother Summer Rose died when she was very young, Ruby was raised on the island of Patch by her father Taiyang and her older half-sister Yang Xiao Long. Her honorary uncle Qrow Branwen teaches her how to wield the scythe and to fight properly, with Ruby stating that she was "complete garbage" before he took her in as his pupil. Ruby was also inspired by the heroic fairy tales Yang used to read to her as a child to become a Huntress to protect the world from evil. Her greatest weakness is her admiration of Summer, as shown when she falls into deep depression after learning that Salem was the one who killed her mother. Her depression worsens after learning of Penny's death after the fall of Atlas.

At the start of the series, Ruby is able to impress Professor Ozpin with her skills when she attempts to stop Roman Torchwick. Ozpin then decides to allow Ruby to enroll in Beacon Academy two years early. Despite her social awkwardness, obsession with weapons, and dependence on her sister, Ruby becomes friends with her classmates while exhibiting the skills and qualities that placed her as the leader of Team RWBY. 

In Volume 4, informally calling themselves Team RNJR (pronounced "ranger"), Ruby travels with the remaining members of Team JNPR to Haven Academy in Mistral in order to find leads on their enemies. However in Volume 5, Ruby gradually reunites with Weiss, Blake and Yang and reforms Team RWBY

Ruby alludes to the fairy tale character Little Red Riding Hood.

Weiss Schnee 

 Voiced By: Kara Eberle, Casey Lee Williams (singing voice) / Yōko Hikasa
The 17-year-old heiress to the Schnee family, a powerful high-class family based in Atlas. Their Schnee Dust Company provides much of the worldwide supply of Dust, despite the family being targeted by the White Fang due to the immoral business ethics of Weiss’ father Jacques, which included mistreatment of Faunus laborers. While inheriting her family's white hair and blue eyes, Weiss gained a noticeable scar over her left eye as a result of fighting an Arma Gigas. Weiss uses a Dust revolver/rapier named Myrtenaster. The sheath can create more than one change of elemental Dust, using a dial like silver encasement just above the bottom of her sword. The Dust crystals encrusted in the encasement allow Weiss to change the power of her sword in battle. Her Semblance is unique in the way that it is a hereditary trait in her family. Her ability consists of "Glyphs" that have a variety of push and pull effects, and the ability to summon previously defeated foes with the Arma Gigas as her primary summon.

Weiss chose to become a Huntress at Beacon Academy with aspirations of restoring her family's honor, as she disagreed with her father's business methods. While initially an egotistic know-it-all with some misplaced prejudice toward the Faunus, she gradually matures and gains understanding, repeatedly showing great trust in her teammates. Weiss greatly admires her older sister Winter, but has a more distant relationship with the rest of her family and even gets disinherited by Jacques. But in Volume 7, Weiss gets the last laugh when she provides evidence for her father's arrest. Weiss slowly makes amends with Whitely, Willow and Winter in the following volume.

In RWBY: Ice Queendom an alternate version of Weiss, dubbed "Negative Weiss", serves as the main antagonist of the anime. She was created after the real Weiss was possessed by a Nightmare Grimm. She was defeated when Ruby and Negative Blake severed Weiss' connection to the Nightmare.

Weiss alludes to Snow White, as her full name Weiss Schnee is German for "White Snow". Character designer Ein Lee said that Weiss was her favorite character among the four main girls to draw: "She's so delicate, and I love princess types."

Blake Belladonna 

 Voiced By: Arryn Zech / Yū Shimamura

Blake is introduced as a 17-year old Faunus with cat ears with a love for books. She is a former member of the White Fang who left in disgust over the disregard for civilian lives by her former lover Adam. Blake's weapon is the Gambol Shroud, a "variant ballistic chain scythe" according to Oum with a sharpened sheath that has a pistol in the hilt, which is also attached to a long ribbon. Blake uses blade and sheath in attacking combinations, while also using the momentum of the blade anchored to an object to maneuver herself with the ribbon, even in midair. Her Semblance, "Shadow", allows her to create a hollow clone of herself that functions as an afterimage decoy while she moves in a different direction, later using Dust to give the clone an additional effect depending on the type of Dust used. Before Volume 4, Blake concealed her Faunus identity by hiding her cat ears under a black bow as she felt she would have experienced discrimination like other Faunus. As a cat Faunus, Blake often exhibits feline behavior like being fearful of Ruby and Yang's pet dog Zwei and fish being her favorite food.

In the Volume 1 finale, Blake accidentally reveals herself to be a Faunus to her team and runs away but is found by Sun. After confronting the White Fang over their alliance with Torchwick, Blake returns to her team and makes amends with Weiss. After the Fall of Beacon, during which Yang was severely injured by Adam when she came to her aid, Blake runs off without telling anyone as she leaves for her homeland in the island nation of Menagerie to settle things with her parents. In Volume 4, after being ridiculed by Sun for her actions in Beacon, Blake decides to take back the White Fang once learning of Adam's plan to take control of the organization and attack Haven.

In Volume 5, following a seemingly hopeless attempt to rally the people of Menagerie to protect Haven from the White Fang, Blake wins her peoples' support when the White Fang attempt to kill her parents while redeeming Ilia. In the Battle of Haven, Blake leads the Menagerians and stops Adam's attack while destroying his reputation within the White Fang. After successfully defending Haven, Blake reunites with Team RWBY Despite returning to the group, Blake still feels uneasy with Yang out of guilt for her injuries during the Fall of Beacon. She eventually confronts Adam in the volume finale and is easily overwhelmed and her sword is destroyed, but she is eventually saved by Yang, and the two team up to defeat and kill Adam.

In Volume 9, using her knowledge of the fairy tale The Girl Who Fell Through the World, Blake helps the team with where to go next as they navigate the Ever After.

In Ice Queendom, Blake creates a negative version of herself using the Nightmare that possessed Jaune to help Ruby in defeating Negative Weiss. Afterwards, she regains control of herself with Yang's help.

Blake is an allusion to Beauty and the Beast, arguably to both Belle and the beast.

Yang Xiao Long 

 Voiced By: Barbara Dunkelman / Ami Koshimizu

Yang, the fourth member of Team RWBY, is a blonde-haired girl and, at 17 years of age, Ruby's older half-sister. She wields twin shotgun gauntlets called Ember Celica. After she loses her right arm (and thus the gauntlet) in Volume 3, her replacement bionic arm is installed with a shotgun mechanism at the wrist. In Volume 7, Yang has Pietro add sticky grenades to her arsenal. Her Semblance, "Burn", works on a "recoil-based system": whenever Yang takes a hit, her strength, toughness and striking power rise in proportion to her injuries. Her glowing hair and eye color change are caused by excess energy from the buildup, which also results in Yang often acting very "hotheaded" in battle.

Yang is the "big sister" of the group, caring deeply for her teammates. She is also very optimistic, never giving up in battle and hard times. Yang has revealed that her birth mother left her family shortly after she was born and hasn't been seen since, which acts as a driving force for her character. She has been determined to find Raven ever since she realized that Summer Rose, Ruby's mother who also helped raise Yang, wasn't her own biological mother. Yang wanted to become a Huntress because of the adventure, as she calls herself a thrill-seeker in search of a life where she doesn't know what lies ahead of her.

Near the end of Volume 3, during the Battle of Beacon, Yang's right arm is severed by White Fang member Adam Taurus, following a desperate attempt to help a wounded Blake. In the aftermath of the fall of Beacon, she is bedridden in her home on the island of Patch, where she has become bitter and depressed. After the time-skip betweens Volume 3 and 4, Yang is still on Patch, trying to get used to life with one arm. She shows signs of PTSD, having visions and nightmares of Adam cutting her arm. She is also shown to be hesitant to use a bionic arm provided to her by Pietro. After an encouraging talk with her father Taiyang, Prof. Port, and Dr. Oobleck, in which Yang admits to being scared of moving on, she puts the arm on and resumes training with her father. In the volume finale, she arrives on the continent of Anima and heads for Mistral to find Ruby.

In Volume 5, Yang's personality has drastically changed to a more serious tone, and her left arm frequently shakes after a fight and when she is emotionally stressed. She approaches Raven and asks her to use her Semblance to teleport her to Ruby and Qrow, and unexpectedly reunites with Weiss. Despite her mother's attempts to convince her to forget about Ruby and join the tribe of bandits, Yang's request is ultimately granted and she and Weiss reunite with Ruby in Mistral. In the Battle of Haven, Yang confronts Raven at the vault and successfully has her mother relinquish the Relic of Knowledge. Reuniting with her teammates, Yang forgives Blake and welcomes her back into the team. In Volume 6, Yang shows no management of her anger when Ozpin's lies are exposed, and still has nightmares of Adam. In Argus, Yang saves Blake from Adam and they team up and kill him overcoming her trauma.

In Volume 7, Yang questions Ruby's decision to hide the truth about Salem and the Relic of Knowledge from Ironwood, and tries to comfort Blake over Adam's death.  In Volume 8, Yang argues with Ruby about the group's next course of action, causing her to temporarily break from the team and lead her own group to evacuate Mantle. But she returns and reconciles with Ruby after a near death encounter with Salem. 

Yang is an allusion to Goldilocks. Prior to the series, one of Oum's Tweets had a photograph of his computer monitor that reveals a file named "Taiyang Xiao Long", later revealed to be the name of Yang's father.

Team JNPR  
Team JNPR (pronounced "juniper") is inspired by historical figures who had taken on the appearance of the opposite gender. In Volume 4 after the loss of Pyrrha, Ruby temporarily joins their group and they informally rename themselves Team RNJR ("ranger").

Jaune Arc 

 Voiced By: Miles Luna / Hiro Shimono
A blond-haired student and the leader of Team JNPR who uses a sword and shield combination called Crocea Mors, an heirloom formerly belonging to his great-great-grandfather. His shield can fold into a sheath for his sword, although it retains its weight. In Volume 4, Jaune upgraded the shield so that it can act as a second blade for the sword. In Volume 7, the shield is further upgraded by Pietro with hardened light Dust on the sides that Jaune can use to act as a glider in air, and the crest can now hold Dust. His Semblance, "Aura Amp", allows him to amplify his Aura or that of others, and he can quickly recharge his Aura even when broken by Volume 7.

Jaune tries to appear confident in front of the girls, especially Weiss, but it often does not work out and he gets depressed over it, although because he treats Pyrrha normally, the latter is attracted to him. In one of the Volume 1 storylines, he is bullied by Cardin Winchester, although he later stands up for his teammates by disobeying Cardin's order to prank Pyrrha, and then saves Cardin from an Ursa. Although he used fake transcripts to get into Beacon and had not attended combat school, he is supported by his schoolmates who believe in his leadership, and his partner Pyrrha later helps him train. In Volume 2, Jaune frequently advances on Weiss but is turned down every time. At the school ball, he learns of Pyrrha's attraction to him and makes amends with her. 

In the end of Volume 3, Jaune goes with Ruby, Nora and Ren to Haven in search for answers and find the ones responsible for the events at Vale and Beacon, as well as Pyrrha's death. In Volume 4, he has Crocea Mors upgraded with accents from Pyrrha's old armor, and wears a sash around his waist in her memory, and continues to be heavily affected by her death. In Volume 5, upon being confronted by Cinder Fall, Jaune fights her to avenge Pyrrha but is easily overpowered. After Weiss is fatally impaled by Cinder, Jaune unlocks his Semblance and saves her from certain death. In Volume 6, upon learning of Ozpin and Salem's past, he lashes out at Oscar for being Ozpin's vessel. But upon finding Pyrrha's statue and coming to terms with her death, Jaune makes amends with Oscar and offers a plan of stealing an Atlesian airship to get to Atlas.

In the finale of Volume 8, Jaune regretfully kills Penny so she can pass on the Winter Maiden's power to Winter. He later falls into the void as the passageways to Vacuo are destroyed by Cinder. In Volume 9, a much older Jaune has become the Rusted Knight of Ever After, still fighting with his broken sword and riding a mythical deer named Juniper.

His name is a reference to the French heroine Joan of Arc.

Nora Valkyrie 
 Voiced By: Samantha Ireland, Kristen McGuire (Young) / Aya Suzaki
An orange-haired student at Beacon who carries Magnhild, a war hammer that can be converted into a grenade launcher.  In Volume 4, Nora has upgraded Magnhild, so that it can apparently hold a stronger electric charge. Her Semblance, "High Voltage", is the production and manipulation of electricity, allowing her to channel the energy to her muscles and gain superhuman strength. Nora is very talkative and hyperactive, which tends to annoy her teammates, but she's also the most positive member of the team, almost always staying upbeat. She also displays a serious side when necessary, as when she tries to protect Ruby from Tyrian and when she calms Ren down during their battle with the Nuckelavee. She and Ren are long-time friends, though Jaune briefly assumes the two are a couple, which causes Nora to quickly say that they're not "together-together".

In a flashback in Volume 4, it's revealed that Nora was living on the streets of Kuroyuri when she was a child. When the village was attacked by Grimm and Nora was abandoned by her mother, Ren saved her, beginning their friendship. In the end of Volume 3, Nora goes with Ruby, Jaune and Ren to Haven.

In Volume 7, Nora is disheartened when Ren gives her the cold shoulder during their first mission in Atlas. In Volume 8, Nora's estrangement with Ren worsens as she joins Ruby's group to launch Amity. But she later shows signs of codependence as she admits that she is lost without Ren. At the command center when Penny is overpowered by the Ace-Ops, Nora overexerts herself by absorbing too much electricity to break the others free from the control room to rescue the android. After finding out that her scars won't go away with Jaune's help, Nora admits her love for Ren but wants to find her self identity before entering a relationship with him.

Her first name comes from the Nora Barlow Columbine, while her last name, "Valkyrie", is inspired by the female warriors found in Norse mythology. She alludes to the Norse god Thor. According to the show's producers, the concept of her weapon was based on the annual Festival of Exploding Hammers in Mexico.

Pyrrha Nikos 

 Voiced By: Jen Brown / Megumi Toyoguchi (Volumes 1–2, Volume 3 (Blu-Ray/DVD)), Shizuka Itō (Volume 3 (TV))
A red-haired student with a long ponytail and bright green eyes. She wielded Miló, a javelin that could transform into a rifle or a xiphos sword, and a shield called Akoúo̱. Her Semblance is "Polarity", which is the ability to manipulate objects with magnetism.

Prior to enrolling at Beacon, she graduated from Sanctum Academy with highest honors and had a record number of wins at a regional tournament for Huntsmen and Huntresses, landing her a cover photo on a Pumpkin Pete's cereal box. Due to her reputation, she has found forming relationships with others difficult because others often assume she is "too good for them" and that she is "at a level they simply cannot obtain". When Jaune ignores that and treats her normally, she becomes attracted to him and chooses him as her partner during the initiation. In Volume 3, Ozpin selects her to be the next Fall Maiden as he and Ironwood are forced to execute the transference by transplanting Amber's dying soul into her body, which Pyrrha feared as it would either kill her or she would no longer be herself. Though Pyrrha decides to go through with it, Cinder kills Amber to complete her transition into the Fall Maiden. Pyrrha attempts to stop Cinder after getting Jaune to safety, but is overpowered and incinerated.. Pyrrha's death affected Ruby, who saw her die and awakened her power, and Jaune, who uses a training video she made for him where she nearly confesses her feelings for him. But Jaune eventually moves on after coming across a memorial statue of Pyrrha in Argus and speaking with a mysterious woman, inspiring him and his fellow surviving JNPR teammates to continue their mission.

Monty Oum stated that Pyrrha was given her name for her red hair, and her full name is a reference to a Pyrrhic victory. She also alludes to Achilles from Homer's The Iliad.

Lie Ren 

 Voiced By: Monty Oum (Volumes 1–2), Neath Oum (Volume 3–present),  Apphia Yu (Young) / Soma Saito
A black-haired student at Beacon who dual wields machine pistols with attached blades, collectively called StormFlower. In Volume 7, Pietro upgraded StormFlower so the blades can be projected from the guns to act as grappling hooks. His Semblance, "Tranquility", masks negative emotion, which allows him and his targets to avoid detection from Grimm. In Volume 8, Ren's Semblance evolves to allow him to see the emotions of those around him in the form of lotus petals with various colors. His power also allows him to detect the emotions of those nearby He and Nora are long-time friends, though he is the exact opposite of her, as he is mostly quiet, mellow and mature.

Originally from Kuroyuri village in the Anima continent, Ren lost his parents during a Grimm attack by Nuckelavee with his awakened Semblance allowing him and Nora to be the only survivors of the attack. Joining Ruby alongside Jaune and Nora to Haven in the Volume 3 finale, Ren is able to avenge his parents when they encounter Nuckelavee after ending up in Kuroyuri, and reciprocate Nora's feelings for him. In Volume 7, Ren's relationship with Nora turns for the worse when he ignores her affections for him during their first mission in Atlas. In Volume 8 their relationship is further strained when they join separate groups. Ren later makes amends with Nora and admits his love for her.

While his name in Chinese (猎人) translates to "huntsman", Ren (蓮) is also Japanese for "lotus", which is his emblem. He alludes to the legendary Chinese hero Hua Mulan.

Qrow Branwen 

 Voiced by: Vic Mignogna (Volumes 3–6), Jason Liebrecht (Volume 7–present)  / Hiroaki Hirata

A cool-headed and nonchalant former instructor at Signal Academy with a heavy drinking habit, Qrow is Raven's younger twin brother, making him Yang's biological uncle and an honorary uncle to Ruby. He was the fourth member of Team STRQ. Having taught Ruby to wield her Crescent Rose, his weapon, Harbinger, is a giant sword that can transform into a cannon or a scythe. Volume 6 reveals that he based Harbinger's design off of Maria's weapons because he admired her as the Grimm Reaper. His Semblance, "Misfortune", brings negative probability to those around him, and unlike other Huntsmen, his is always active and uncontrollable, with the result that he tries to fight alone so that it affects his enemies and not his comrades.

As revealed in Volume 5, being originally part of the Branwen Tribe, he and Raven were sent into Beacon to be trained as Hunters to give their people an advantage against Hunters. But Qrow renounces his kin for being killers and thieves, becoming a member of Ozpin's inner circle while given the ability to transform into a crow to serve as Ozpin's spy. For the first two volumes, Qrow works as Ozpin's scout to find out about Salem's plans. Qrow makes his official debut in Volume 3 as he reveals to Ozpin that their enemies are making a move on Beacon.

After the Fall of Beacon, Qrow tells Ruby that he specifically worked for Ozpin and resolve to continue in the man's stead while discreetly following Team RNJR as they head for Haven. In Volume 4, Qrow continues to watch over the team discreetly while having an encounter with Raven in Higanbana. Qrow ends up revealing himself to Ruby when Tyrian attacks her group and ends up being poisoned by Tyrian's stinger, revealing most of what he knew to Team RNJR as they manage to get him to Mistral for a quick recovery. In Volume 5, Qrow disowns Raven when she allied herself with Salem. In Volume 6, Qrow's faith in Ozpin is destroyed when he learns of his leader's past and lack of a plan to destroy Salem. His alcoholism worsens and causes problems for the group, especially for Ruby. After the fights with Cordovin and the Leviathan, Qrow begins to abstain from alcohol.

In Volume 7, Qrow is in awe of Clover because of his good fortune Semblance and bonds with him. Qrow teams up with Clover during the Battle of Mantle to help Robyn subdue Tyrian, only to be devastated when Tyrian kills Clover. Qrow, along with Robyn, is arrested by Atlesian forces when Tyrian frames him for Clover's death. In Volume 8, Qrow escapes imprisonment with Robyn to initially find and kill Ironwood, but later works with Robyn and Marrow to stop Ironwood's bomb from going to Mantle. 

Qrow alludes to Muninn from Norse mythology and is based on the Scarecrow from The Wonderful Wizard of Oz.

Ozma

 Voiced by Aaron Dismuke and Shannon McCormick
An ancient warrior who was Salem's lover before he died from an illness. As Salem's desire to resurrect Ozma resulted in her rebellion against the gods, Ozma is brought back to life by the God of Light to stop her. But even vowing to reincarnate forever until Salem is defeated, Jinn reveals that Ozma cannot kill his former lover. Every time he dies, his soul transmigrates into a new like-minded host, allowing him to take control of his host body while both can access each other's memories with Professor Ozpin his current incarnation at the start of the series and referred as such before his origins are revealed. One of his past incarnations was the basis of the wizard from a story based on the creation of the first Maidens, another being a king who fought through war. Though he is stoic and affable to those around him and can be blunt at times, he is a humble man who deeply cares for his students despite admitting to being slightly mistrustful due to countless acts of betrayal he suffered across his past lives.. Ozma is named after Princess Ozma from the Oz book series, his reincarnations reference the title character of The Wonderful Wizard of Oz.

Professor Ozpin
 Voiced by Shannon McCormick / Kazuhiko Inoue
The headmaster of Beacon Academy, armed with a cane, The Long Memory, which has numerous functions that include serving as a melee weapon capable of generating a protective force field. The cane has vast amount of powerful kinetic energy stored inside, accumulated by Ozpin during his past lifetimes. Despite appearances, Ozpin is gradually revealed as Ozma's reincarnation.

In Volume 1, Ozpin allows Ruby to enroll into Beacon 2 years early after she stops one of Torchwick's robberies. In Volume 3, Ozpin chooses Pyrrha to become the next Fall Maiden, but his efforts are thwarted by Cinder Fall and he is killed by her in battle. In Volume 4, Ozpin's soul or part of it transmigrates into the body of Oscar Pine, whom he urged to reach Haven where he is reunited with Qrow. In Volume 5, Ozpin tasks Qrow to find Huntsmen to protect the Relic of Knowledge while he personally trains Team RNJR and Oscar for their eventual fight with fight Salem. In Volume 6, Ozpin comes under fire for withholding vital information as he admits to being slightly mistrustful due to countless acts of betrayal he suffered across his past lives. After his secret past is exposed by Jinn, he loses everyone's trust and he seals himself within Oscar's mind. But he guides Oscar in the volume finale, and later in the end of Volume 7, Ozpin emerges from Oscar's mind after the farmboy is knocked out of Atlas by Ironwood and guides him to safely land on Mantle. In Volume 8, Ozpin apologizes to Ruby's group for not trusting them and reveals the existence of Ambrosius.

Oscar Pine

 Voiced by Aaron Dismuke / Rie Kugimiya
A young farm boy who appears in Volume 4 and lives with his aunt before starting to hear Ozpin's voice mysteriously communicating to him. It would later be revealed that Oscar has become Ozpin's new vessel following his demise in the Volume 3 finale. A reluctant Oscar eventually complies with Ozpin's request to travel to Haven. Once in Mistral, Oscar meets Qrow and receives Ozpin's cane as he joins Ruby's group, while revealing he can become a temporary medium for them to directly communicate with Ozpin. He later trains alongside Team RNJR to strengthen his Aura and discover his Semblance. In Volume 6, Oscar is able to resist Ozpin's control and helps Ruby to summon Jinn, only to end up being ostracized by most of the others by extension, when they lose trust in Ozpin. In Argus, Oscar is assaulted by Jaune and leaves the group for a while to have time to himself before returning to the group to help them with the time he has left as Oscar. 

In Volume 7, Oscar is entrusted with the Relic of Knowledge by Ruby but is uneasy with Ruby's decision to hide what they know about Salem and the Relic from Ironwood, as he feels that they are doing the same as what Ozpin did to them. But he loses the Relic to Neo near the end of the volume. In Volume 8, Oscar is captured by the Hound, taken to Salem, and is tortured by both her and Hazel on how to activate the Relic of Knowledge. But he escapes with Yang's group while destroying the Monstra with the Long Memory.

He is believed to allude to Tippetarius, or the disguised form of Princess Ozma from The Marvelous Land of Oz

Penny Polendina 
 Voiced by: Taylor "Pelto" McNee (English): / Megumi Han

An orange-haired student came to the Vytal Festival to compete in the combat tournament. She wields Floating Array: a small backpack that contains an array of gun-bladed weapons and wires. She can also use the swords as an energy beam cannon. She is known to act awkwardly around people, though she quickly becomes friends with Ruby. Penny is an android capable of generating an Aura that originally belonged to her creator, Pietro. In Volume 3, during Penny's battle against Pyrrha in the Vytal Festival, Pyrrha is affected by Emerald's hallucinating Semblance, reflecting Penny's attack, causing the wires connected to her swords to tear her apart. In Volume 7, Penny is shown to have been rebuilt sometime after the Fall of Beacon and upgraded with thrusters in her feet allowing her to fly. She has become the protector of Mantle and part of Ironwood's inner circle. In the volume finale, while helping Winter in receiving the Winter Maiden's power, Penny ends up inheriting the Maiden's power while confronted by Cinder. In Volume 8, Penny is hacked by Watts through her sword stolen by the Ace-Ops and is occasionally controlled by his virus. At the vault, Penny opens it for Team RWBY and succumbs to the virus. But her soul is separated from her robot body by Ambrosius, and she is given a human body as her old one is terminated. In the passageways to Vacuo, Penny is mortally wounded by Cinder. She lets Jaune kill her so that she can pass the Maiden's power to Winter.

Penny alludes to the character Pinocchio, hiccuping every time she tells a lie.

RWBY x Justice League & Justice League x RWBY: Super Heroes and Huntsmen
In March of 2021, DC Comics published a crossover comic series, RWBY x Justice League featuring several iconic superheroes from the Justice League. However, these characters are Remnant parallels from their DC counterparts. In Justice League x RWBY: Super Heroes and Huntsmen, the Justice League are the originals that were transported to Remnant and placed inside the bodies of teenagers, with some of them turning into Faunus.
Clark Kent Voiced by: Chandler Riggs: In the comics, Clark is a farm boy from Patch who helps Taiyang with farming. His Semblance, "Yellow Sun Empowerment", gives him super strength, speed, heat vision and flight. According to Clark, his Semblance draws power from the sun and he cannot use it during nighttime. In the movies, Clark uses a hand-held hammer in battle. he is based on Superman.
Diana Prince Voiced by: Natalie Alyn Lind: In the comics, Diana is an automaton created by her Faunus mothers. Her Semblance, "Weapon Summoning", calls forth her lasso, tiara and gauntlets. Diana is based on Wonder Woman.
Bruce Wayne Voiced by: Nat Wolff: In the comics, Bruce is a wealthy Faunus with bat ears hailing from Atlas. His weapon, Batwing, is a double headed battle axe. His Semblance, "Detective Mode", gives him the ability to detect patterns and unlock puzzles. In the movies, Bruce has bat wings instead of ears. He is based on Batman.
Barry Allen Voiced by: David Errigo Jr.: In the comics, Barry is a tortoise Faunus with green scales on his shoulders. His Semblance, "Constant Speed" makes him super fast and leaves a trail of lightning. In the movies, Barry is human and fights with a spear. He is based on the Flash.
Jesse Quick A Faunus with a fox tail. She is based on Jesse Chambers.
Victor Stone Voiced by: Tru Valentino: A cyborg. In the comics, he was an astronaut that was involved in a space program accident which he miraculously survived. Victor holds a grudge against the SDC and steals their technology for his prosthetic parts. He is based on Cyborg.
Arthur Curry A Faunus with shark fins on his elbows and back. His Semblance enables him to communicate with animals through telepathy. In the past, Arthur saved Clark's life in a Dust mine. He is based on Aquaman.
Jessica Cruz Voiced by: Jeannie Tirado: A member of the Green Lantern Corps. In the comics, Jessica arrived on Remnant in search of Starro, acquiring a Semblance while still able to use her Lantern Ring. She saved Victor from the space program accident. Jessica is based on the Green Lantern.
Mari McCabe Voiced by Ozioma Akagha: In the movies, Mari is a fox-tailed Faunus who utilizes a machete with her Tantu Totem to summon animal spirits. She is based off of Vixen.

Supporting characters

Maria Calavera 
 Voiced by: Melissa Sternenberg

An elderly woman with prosthetic eyes, though she cannot see color with them. She was originally a silver-eyed Huntress known as the Grimm Reaper before being blinded by the Faunus assassin Tock. Maria received her prosthetic eyes from Pietro, and they have been close friends ever since. The cane she uses was one of her two kamas, Life and Death, that combine at the ends to form a twin-bladed weapon. Her Semblance, which she calls "Preflexes", allows her to react to attacks almost before they happen. Unlike most Hunters, due to the risk of being targeted by Salem, Maria was trained by her father instead of attending a school. She meets Team RWBY, Qrow and Oscar after they crash-land into the snow region of northern Anima. Upon learning that Ruby has silver eyes, Maria teaches her to consciously use her powers when they are attacked by the Apathy Grimm. In Argus, she becomes a mentor to Ruby and shares what she knows about the silver eyes.

She alludes to the typical image of the Grim Reaper in popular culture.

Emerald Sustrai 
 Voiced by: Katie Newville / Marina Inoue

A light green-haired girl with dark skin who was an associate of Cinder's and uses Thief's Respite, a pair of pistols with attached blades that can also extend via chains, similar to a kusarigama. Her Semblance, "Hallucinations", allows her to cast hallucinations on people's minds, advantageous for her thieving skills, though it becomes a strain to her if she tries to do it on more than one person. By the time of Volume 8, Emerald has trained in improving her Semblance, as she can cast hallucinations on multiple people and keep them for an extended period of time. Ever since she was recruited by Cinder, Emerald had an undying loyalty to her, even if she serves someone as evil as Salem. But after she learns of Salem's true goals and is nearly killed by the witch, Emerald defects to support Ruby's group.

She alludes to Aladdin from the classic anthology book One Thousand and One Nights.

Team STRQ 

Team STRQ (pronounced "stark") is a now-defunct team composed of Ruby and Yang's relatives, commented to have similarities to Team RWBY like being favored by Ozpin.
  The presumed leader of Team STRQ, and the mother of Ruby and stepmother of Yang whose gravestone is frequently visited by Ruby. She is later revealed to be the second lover to Yang and Ruby's father, Taiyang, the first being Yang's mother, Raven, but whether she married him is currently unknown. Based on an old photograph of her, Summer wore a white hooded cloak, similar to the red cloak Ruby would later wear. According to Yang, Summer went on a mission but never came back and her death deeply affected Ruby and Taiyang. Prior to her disappearance, Yang says that she remembered Summer as a "Super Mom", able to handle being a loving parent as well as able to go on dangerous missions.  In the Volume 6 finale, Summer is shown in person during a flashback, revealing that she, like her daughter, possesses silver eyes. . In Volume 7, Qrow tells Ruby that even Ozpin did not know the nature of Summer's last mission, Salem revealing herself as the one who is responsible for Summer's fate.  Her full name is a reference to the poem, The Last Rose of Summer, and her gravestone has a line from the poem, "Thus kindly I scatter." 
 Voiced by: Burnie Burns / Kenyu HoriuchiYang and Ruby's widowed father, only mentioned many times in the first two Volumes before appearing out of focus seen when Ruby visits Summer's grave.  He appears in the Volume 3 finale where he watches over his daughters in their home in Patch as they recover from the Battle of Beacon.  Taiyang is mentioned to be a bit overprotective of both of his daughters and loves them dearly. Like Qrow, he is also a teacher at Signal. In Volume 4, Taiyang receives a bionic arm for Yang from Ironwood and encourages Yang to gradually accept the prosthesis while training her to not depend too much on her Semblance and opening up about Raven. His name, Taiyang (太阳), is Chinese for "sun."

Beacon Academy/Vale

 Voiced by: Kathleen Zuelch (Volumes 1–3), Tiana Camacho (Ice Queendom, Justice Lague X RWBY: Super Heroes and Huntsmen, Part One) / Masumi AsanoA Huntress and teacher at Beacon Academy who wields a riding crop, The Disciplinarian, as her weapon, in a similar fashion as a magic wand, and whose Semblance is "Telekinesis". With her Semblance, not only can she control objects, but can also repair those which were broken before. She mostly teaches combat classes, tends to be more stern and strict with her students, and is apparently behind only Ozpin in rank at Beacon. In Volume 4, Port and Oobleck reveal that Goodwitch is working to restore Beacon to its former glory.  Her name is derived from the character Glinda the Good Witch of The Wonderful Wizard of Oz.
 Voiced by: Ryan Haywood (Volumes 1–4) / Anthony Sardinha (Grimm Eclipse) / Soichi AbeA veteran Huntsman and teacher at Beacon Academy, and is an expert on fighting different creatures of Grimm. His weapon, Blowhard, is a blunderbuss that has axe blades attached to the stock. In Volume 1, Port tells Weiss to be more humble and support Ruby as a teammate.  In Volume 4, it is Port who tells Yang that she needs to handle her fears. It is also shown that he is afraid of mice. His name and his tale of taking on a Beowolf in his youth allude to Peter and the Wolf.
 Voiced by: Joel Heyman  / Yuichi KarasumaA teacher at Beacon Academy, teaching Remnant history. His weapon of choice is Antiquity's Roast, a thermos (from which he drinks coffee out of) that can also transform into a flamethrower. He frequently sips coffee and moves around and speaks at an extremely accelerated rate. Despite his bumbling nature, he is actually very wise and knowledgeable, choosing to learn from mankind's past mistakes so that they won't happen again in the future. Unlike other Huntsmen who fight, Oobleck chooses to defend people by passing his knowledge on to other Huntsmen and Huntresses. He believes that knowledge is the most powerful weapon from all of them. He is named after the children's book Bartholomew and the Oobleck by Dr. Seuss.

Team CRDL

Team CRDL (pronounced "cardinal") is formed as another first-year team at Beacon Academy, alongside RWBY and JNPR.
  Voiced by: Adam Ellis  / Subaru Kimura: A burnt orange-haired student and the leader of Team CRDL. He wears silver-gray armor and wields a giant mace called The Executioner. Cardin has a reputation as a bully, he and the rest of his team are shown to be picking on several fellow students. After he finds out that Jaune Arc faked his application to Beacon, he is briefly able to manipulate him into doing his bidding. He also, alongside the rest of his team, bullies Velvet Scarlatina because of her being a Faunus. Cardin alludes to the Cardinal of Winchester who presided over the Trial of Joan of Arc.
  Voiced by: Shane Newville  / Jun Miyamoto: A green-haired student who wields a pair of Dust-daggers, Shortwings, as a shout out to Will Scarlet. 
 : A light brown-haired student who fights with a long sword called Hallshott that can fire bullets.
 : A dark blue-haired student whose weapon is a halberd called Feather's Edge.

Team CFVY

Team CFVY (pronounced "coffee") consists of second-year Beacon Academy students. Velvet Scarlatina first appears in Volume 1, while the others begin appearing in Volume 2. They serve as the protagonists of RWBY: After the Fall novel series, having been transferred to Shade Academy in Vacuo following the Fall of Beacon. The team's members have a red and brown color scheme and are named after desserts.

  Voiced by: Ashley Jenkins / Shizuka Itō: A fashionably dressed girl with military-themed accessories and wields her weapon Gianduja, a briefcase that transforms into a minigun. Its destructive power is magnified due to her "Hype" Semblance, allowing her Aura to enhance the effect and power of anything Dust-based. Her name is derived from Cocoa, theorized to be based on Coco Chanel.
  A young, black, blind man who was an orphan living in Vacuo before attending Beacon, wearing an orange vest and armed with his weapon Sharp Retribution, a pair of wrist-mounted blades. His Semblance is "Telepathy", which allows him to compensate for his blindness while allowing him to communicate with his teammates. His name is derived from fox hunter pie, as well as the story of The Fox and the Hound.
  Voiced by: Caiti Ward  / Megumi Han: A brown-haired Faunus with rabbit ears at Beacon Academy. Monty has described her combat style to be very mage-like, along with being very agile. Her weapon, Anesidora, is a camera that she uses to take pictures of other students' weapons, which allows her to conjure holographic copies of their weapons, but can only be used once per picture. She uses her weapon in conjunction with her Semblance, "Photographic Memory", which allows her to mimic other people's moves. Rooster Teeth held a fan contest to design her combat uniform, the result of which was announced on March 6, 2014. Her name is derived from The Velveteen Rabbit and red velvet cake.
  Voiced by: Joe MacDonald / Ryōsuke Morita: The final member of team CFVY, Yatsuhashi is a tall male in a green one-sleeved robe armed with Fulcrum, a long sword. His Semblance, "Memory Wiping", allows him to erase a person's memories when he touches them, trivial memories permanently lost while the timing that important ones are later recalled within a duration of time equal to how long Yatsuhashi was touching that person. His name comes from the Japanese treat of the same name, and his name was revealed in a series of tweets of the treat by Monty culminating in a singular image of Yatsuhashi Kengyo along with the phrase "You'll figure it out".

Junior's faction

  Voiced by: Jack Shannon Pattillo / Katsuya Miyamoto: A club manager who fights Yang in the "Yellow" trailer. His weapon is a bazooka that can change into a large bat-like club. He has some sort of connection to Torchwick, who initially recruited Junior's minions for his early dust robberies before replacing the henchmen with White Fang members. His name means "black bear" in Chinese, with his nickname alluding to the baby bear from Goldilocks.
  Voiced by Maggie Tominey / Aya Suzaki: A pair of black-haired twins who work for Junior. They are the daughters of gangster leader, Lil' Miss Malachite. Melanie fights with bladed heels while Miltia utilizes a pair of claws. They are altered designs of the first design of Ruby and Weiss, and they allude to the story of Snow White and Rose Red.

Others
 : Ruby and Yang's pet Pembroke Welsh Corgi. He only makes a few appearances in the main RWBY series but is featured more extensively in the RWBY Chibi series.  In Volume 2, Zwei is sent to Ruby and Yang by Taiyang via mail to be taken care of.  After Ruby sneaks the dog on her team's assignment, he helps them and Oobleck fighting Torchwick and the White Fang. Zwei returns to the family home in Patch following the Fall of Beacon.  His name is a play on the corgi Ein from the manga/anime series Cowboy Bebop.
  Voiced by: Patrick Rodriguez: A shop owner of various places such as From Dust Till Dawn. He is often seen being robbed or his property damaged. In Volumes 2 and 3, he operates a noodle stand on the Vytal Festival grounds.  Shopkeep survives the Fall of Beacon and watches Ruby's broadcast to the world with Goodwitch in Volume 8. 
  Voiced by: Adam Ellis / Kenta Miyake: A puma Faunus with finger claws who was a former White Fang member before deserting them to open a book shop in Vale. He planned on fleeing to Vacuo, but he is killed by Mercury and Emerald. 
  Voiced by: Kdin Jenzen / Hiroki Nanami: An original character in Ice Queendom, which takes place between Volumes 1 and 2 of the series. They are a special type of Huntsman called a "Nightmare Hunter", armed with a dreamcatcher-like weapon that helps with capturing Nightmare Grimm. Shion arrives to Beacon during the Team RWBY's initiation test in the Emerald Forest due to a Nightmare possessing Jaune, offering their help when Weiss is attacked by another Nightmare.

Atlas Academy/Atlas

Atlesian Military
General James Ironwood

Winter Schnee

 Voiced by: Elizabeth Maxwell / Ayako Kawasumi

Weiss' elder sister and Ironwood's right hand in the military, armed with a saber with a detachable estoc. Like Weiss, having left the Schnee family to make a difference, Winter inherited their family's "Glyphs" Semblance, which she fully mastered to easily summon constructs modeled after defeated Grimm. While dignified and distant, Winter deeply cares for Weiss and is ill-tempered, as shown when Qrow insulted the Atlas military while provoking her to fight him.

In Volume 3, Winter arrives in Vale to oversee additional security units for the tournament. She then gives Weiss a lesson on how to master summoning techniques before returning home. By Volume 7, Winter has become part of Ironwood's inner circle and is chosen by the general to become the next Winter Maiden. After Penny unexpectedly becomes the new Winter Maiden, Winter severs her ties with Weiss after learning that she betrayed Ironwood. In Volume 8, after recovering from her injuries, Winter replaces Clover as the leader of the Ace-Ops and searches for Penny after Watts' hacking into the robot.  Her loyalty to Ironwood slowly waivers until she eventually defects with Marrow, working with Ruby's group in the Atlas evacuation. In her final fight against Ironwood, she becomes the new Winter Maiden after Penny passes on the powers to her.

Winter is an allusion to The Snow Queen.

Caroline Cordovin
 Voiced by: Mela Lee

The special operative in charge in Argus. Cordovin is a prideful and arrogant woman who looks down on all non-Atlesians, and is emotionally unstable, especially when provoked. Upon meeting the group of heroes, she refuses to allow any of them to go to Atlas, except for Weiss. She also has a bad history with Maria. When the group tries to steal a military airship, Cordovin overreacts by piloting a giant mech called the Colossus to attack them but ultimately loses after Ruby destroys the mech's cannon. In the volume finale, Cordovin finishes off the Leviathan after Ruby freezes it, and then allows the group to continue to Atlas.

Cordovin alludes to the nursery rhyme, "There was an Old Woman Who Lived in a Shoe".

Dr. Pietro Polendina
 Voiced by: Dave Fennoy

An elderly Atlesian scientist who traverses with a mechanic wheelchair, and is responsible for the creation of Penny, Yang's robotic arm, and Maria's cybernetic eyes. Maria visits him roughly every ten years to have her implants adjusted. With Penny's creation, Pietro gave her a huge portion of his Aura. He cherishes Penny as his own daughter but is overprotective of her, so much that he is against letting her going into harm's way to achieve a goal. In his earlier years, Pietro had a team of scientists that included Watts. Before the heroes' first mission in Atlas, Pietro upgrades their weapons at their request. After Penny is framed for committing murder in Mantle, Pietro shows signs of his health deteriorating as he tries to look after his daughter. In Volume 8, Pietro hacks the Ironwood's terminal to send a launch signal for Amity. He and Maria later join Penny at the colosseum to broadcast Ruby's message, but they are thwarted by Cinder. Pietro is initially against Penny's offer to push Amity into broadcast range, and is later devastated when he loses contact with her.

Pietro is an allusion to Geppetto from Pinocchio.

Ace-Ops
The Ace-Ops are a special team of Huntsmen in the Atlas Military. Like Winter and Penny, they are part of Ironwood's inner circle. In Volume 8, The Ace-Ops are led by Winter following Clover's death. Each member is an allusion to one of the Aesop's Fables, with the team's name being a homophone of the word 'Aesop'.
  Voiced by: Chris Wehkamp: Leader of the Ace-Ops who wields an extendable fishing pole called Kingfisher. His Semblance is good fortune. Clover develops a friendship with Qrow, and seems to have had a past relationship with Robyn. During the Battle of Mantle, Clover and Qrow join Robyn in confronting Tyrian. But when he is ordered by Ironwood to arrest Qrow, Clover fights both Qrow and Tyrian and is killed by the Faunus with Qrow's sword, with a remorseful Qrow and Robyn framed for his murder. He alludes to A Fisherman’s Good Luck.
Elm Ederne Voiced by: Dawn M. Bennett: A muscular woman who wields a giant hammer, Timber, that doubles as a rocket launcher. Her Semblance allows her to use her Aura to root her feet into the ground. In the Volume 8 finale, Elm works with Vine to try to stop Harriet from destroying Mantle, and is later devastated by Vine's death. Elm alludes to the elm from The Elm and The Vine.
Marrow Amin Voiced by: Mick Lauer: A dog Faunus who wields Fetch, a machine gun that can extend into a bladed boomerang. His Semblance can freeze specific targets by uttering the word "stay". Marrow was a replacement for former Ace-Op member Tortuga. In Volume 8, Marrow angrily speaks out at Ironwood for his cruel and immoral actions, and is taken away by Winter for both of them to defect. He then aids Qrow and Robyn in stopping Ironwood's bomb from falling on Mantle. Marrow alludes to The Dog and Its Reflection.
Harriet Bree Voiced by: Anairis Quinones: A woman with a mohawk who wields exoskeletal gauntlets called Fast Knuckles. Her Semblance allows her to move super fast, and she notes that her reaction time is quicker than Ruby's. Although she trusts her fellow Ace-Ops, Harriet only sees her team as coworkers and not as friends. In Volume 8, Harriet is the Ace-Op that is most hostile towards Ruby's group for their treachery to Ironwood, going so far as to be willing to kill them. She later carries the bomb herself to Mantle, but stands down when her teammates plead for her to stop and is mostly responsible for Vine's sacrifice. Harriet alludes to the hare from The Tortoise and the Hare.
Vine Zeki Voiced by: Todd Womack: A pale man with unique forehead tattoos and wields Thorn, a giant shuriken-like weapon. His Semblance allows him to create extendable arms and legs. In Volume 8, Vine is willing to follow through with Ironwood's threat to Mantle to make Ruby's group cease in resisting. But after being initially stopped by Qrow, Robyn and Marrow, Vine comes to his senses and tries to stop Harriet from destroying Mantle. When they are unable to disarm the bomb, Vine sacrifices himself to contain the explosion with his Semblance. Vine alludes to the vine from The Elm and The Vine.

Penny's team
 
  Voiced by: Yssa Badiola / Ami Naito: A dark-skinned girl with a beret who serves as Penny's handler while being unaware of her being an android.

Team FNKI

Team FNKI (pronounced "funky") is a team participating in the Vytal Tournament. Weiss and Yang take on two of their members during the doubles rounds and the two fight during the Battle of Beacon. The other two members are introduced when Team FNKI returns in Volume 7. In Volume 8, Team FNKI is sent to the front lines during the Battle of Atlas. 
  Voiced by: Flynt Flossy / Tooru Sakurai: A dark-skinned boy with a fedora hat who wields a trumpet that can release sound waves to disorient his opponents. His Semblance creates the "Killer Quartet", in which he generates three clones of himself, each wearing a different colored necktie and armed with a trumpet. He initially hated Weiss because her family put his father out of business, but later respects her when she risks her own safety for her team's victory.  His name is taken from a joke commonly used in Rooster Teeth's gaming content division Achievement Hunter's series "Let's Play Minecraft".
  Voiced by: Meg Turney / Konomi Fujimura: A talkative Faunus girl with a cat tail and roller skates who wields a glowstick-like nunchaku. Her name is derived from the internet meme Nyan Cat, and she creates a rainbow trail as she skates. 
  A tall man with long blue hair. He and Ivori allude to the dress, with Kobalt being the black/blue version.
  A grey-haired and tan-skinned man with glasses who uses a whip. He and Kobalt allude to the dress, with Ivori being the gold/white version.

Team BRIR
Team BRIR (pronounced "briar") is a team active in Atlas, but are not native to the kingdom. They serve as supporting characters in the video game RWBY: Arrowfell.
  Voiced by: Alexis Tipton: A blonde haired woman who wields twin prism daggers called Cause and Effect. Her Semblance, "Refraction", can copy other people's Semblances.
  Voiced by: Laura Stahl: A dark-skinned woman with red dreadlocks who wields Drop and Roll, a flamethrower that doubles as a flail. Her Semblance, "Inferno", enhances her weapon's attacks.
 Voiced by: Amanda Lee: A brunette-haired woman who wields a thorn-barbed whip called Pins and Needles. Her Semblance, "Threshold", can create portals that she uses in conjunction with her weapon.
  Voiced by: Judy Alice Lee: A ginger-haired woman who wields a pair of drill gauntlets called Wear and Tear. Her Semblance, "Delve", allows her to "swim" underground.

Happy Huntresses
The Happy Huntresses are composed of Atlas Academy graduates who did not join the military, and instead use their talents to serve Mantle. They refer to the Merry Men.

  Voiced by: Cristina Vee: Leader of the Happy Huntresses and a Mantle politician who is going against Jacques in the council election of Atlas. Her weapon is a wrist-mounted crossbow with bladed fans that act as a shield, and her Semblance acts as a lie detector when she physically holds someone's hand. She seems to have a history with Clover. In her Volume 7 debut, Robyn confronts Clover about Ironwood using vital supplies for his plans with Amity Arena, instead of reinforcing Mantle's defenses. After unfairly losing the election to Jacques after Watts rigs the votes, Robyn steals Amity supplies until she is confronted by Blake and Yang. Despite making amends with Ironwood following Jacques being exposed for his treason, Robyn is arrested with Qrow following Clover's murder by Tyrian. In Volume 8, Robyn escapes with Qrow after Cinder destroys the prison and they try to thwart Ironwood from dropping his bomb on Mantle. Robyn is an allusion to Robin Hood.
  Voiced by: Michele Sontag: A short white-haired Faunus with sheep ears. Her Semblance, "Pocket Dimensions", allows her to teleport objects by touching them. Fiona alludes to Friar Tuck.
  Voiced by: Marissa Lenti: A tall tanned woman with short dark-green hair and a muscular build. Joanna alludes to Little John.
  Voiced by: Kdin Jenzen (Volumes 7–8): A blue-haired woman. Her Semblance enables her to create an illusionary force field, preventing those outside to see what is happening on the inside. Originally part of the upperclass from Atlas, May was disowned by her own family for supporting Mantle. In Volume 8, May helps Ruby's group in sneaking into the Atlas Command Center to launch Amity. May alludes to Maid Marian. Jenzen confirmed on Twitter that May is the cousin of Henry Marigold, and is the first transgender character of the series.

Schnee Household
  Voiced by: John Swasey / Ken Uo: Deceased father of Willow and grandfather of Winter, Weiss, and Whitley, and the founder of the SDC. After working in the mines in his youth, Nicholas took his father's inheritance and formed SCD to provide Dust to the entire world of Remnant. He would personally oversee Dust expeditions and built a trustworthy reputation for the company. But his early days in the Dust mines forced him to retire, and allow his son-in-law, Jacques, to take over SDC. In both Ice Queendom and the portraits in the Schnee manor, Nicholas is a noble knight. Nicholas is an allusion to Santa Claus.
 
  Voiced by: Caitlin Glass / Gara Takashima: The abused wife of Jacques and mother of Winter, Weiss, and Whitley. Like her daughters, Willow has the family Semblance of "Glyphs". She has been an alcoholic since learning that Jacques only married her for the Schnee family name and wealth. In Volume 7, Willow reveals to Weiss that she placed hidden cameras throughout the Schnee manor to spy on Jacques, pleading with her daughter not to abandon Whitley despite siding with their father. In Volume 8, Willow initially struggles with her alcoholism while the Schnee manor is attacked by the Hound. But she uses a summon to save Whitely, and later kills the Grimm with her son by toppling a statue over it. 
  Voiced by: Howard Wang / Marina Inoue: The younger brother of Weiss and Winter, an arrogant youth who considers his older sisters' career choices as pointless and barbaric. In Volume 4, Weiss noting how he seemed different since she first enrolled at Beacon. But in Volume 7, Willow implies to Weiss that Whitley has been subjected to Jacques's abuse since his sister's escape from Schnee manor.  In Volume 8, after witnessing Nora's injuries and partially inspired by Ruby's speech, Whitely begins to mature as he starts to help Weiss and her friends.
  Voiced by: J. Michael Tatum / Ken Uo: The Schnee family butler, Klein is supportive of Weiss and is shown to deeply care for her.  Klein eventually helps Weiss escape from Schnee manor near the end of Volume 4, revealed in Volume 7 to have been fired as a result. In Volume 8, Klein returns to the manor at Whitely's request to treat Nora and Penny.  His full name is German for "small seven", thus he alludes to the seven dwarves from Snow White. This is more evident with his mood swings and eye color.

Others
  Voiced by: Alejandro Saab: An Atlesian citizen who is May Marigold's cousin. In Volume 4, he attends the Schnee charity event without understanding its purpose. Henry tries to woo Weiss, but only angers her and is forced to leave in disgrace.
  Voiced by: Eric Baudor: An avid supporter of Robyn. He is arrested for throwing a brick at a military airship. While on the ship with the heroes, Forest reveals to them about Robyn's campaign. After he is dropped off by the police, Forest is killed by Tyrian.
  Voiced by: Chad James and Anairis Quinones: Two members of the Atlas council. They first appear at Jacques' dinner party to interrogate Ironwood over his recent actions. When Weiss exposes Jacques' secret meeting with Watts, both Sleet and Camilla recognize the mad doctor and learn about Salem's existence from Ironwood. In Volume 8, Sleet is killed by Ironwood after calling out the general for his fear.
  Voiced by: Christian Young: A Huntsman who uses a pair of maces and swords, with the former having guns at the top. His Semblance turns his skin into metal to reduce the effect of blunt and cut trauma. While Cinder was a slave at the Glass Unicorn hotel in Atlas, Rhodes discovered her stealing one of his swords. Taking pity on her, he trained her in secret to become a Huntress. Years later, after discovering that Cinder had killed her stepfamily, Rhodes fought her out of his duty as a Huntsman, only to be killed himself by her. His swords were taken by Cinder following his death.

Haven Academy/Mistral

Professor Leonardo Lionheart

Team SSSN
	
Each member of Team SSSN (pronounced "sun") has a Big Bang motif. They appear alongside Team CFVY in the novel RWBY: Before the Dawn.
 Sun Wukong Voiced by: Michael Jones / Tomoaki Maeno: A blond-haired Faunus with a monkey tail. His weapon, Ruyi Bang and Jingu Bang, is a collapsible bō staff that splits into two nunchaku that can also function as sawed-off shotgun. With his Semblance, "Via Sun", he can create astral projection clones of himself in battle. He possesses great speed and agility from his monkey-like traits and seems to be able to see through disguises, as he noticed Blake's Faunus heritage despite her bow. Even though he attends the academy in Mistral, he's actually a native of Vacuo. He lost his parents at a young age, unable to remember their faces. His only family left is his cousin, Starr Sanzang. In the end of Volume 1, Sun stows away on a ship arriving in Vale and later fights alongside Blake against Torchwick and the White Fang.  In Volume 4, Sun follows Blake to Menagerie without his team to protect her from harm and later ridicules her for abandoning her teammates. In Volume 6, Sun parts ways with Blake and takes his team to Vacuo. In Before the Dawn, Sun struggles to regain the trust of his team after leaving them alone for so long and decides to have them join Team CFVY in their investigation of The Crown. Eventually, after a final battle with The Crown, while defending Shade Academy, Sun makes amends with Team SSSN. Sun alludes to the character of the same name from Journey to the West.
 Scarlet David Voiced by: Gavin Free: A red-haired young man with a cape who wields Hook and Darling, a flintlock pistol and a cutlass, as his weapons of choice. The handle of the pistol can be fired as a grappling hook. His Semblance is "Gliding", which allows him to maneuver in the air and land safely. In the Before the Dawn novel, Scarlet is at odds with Sun due to his leader's constant abandonment of the team. He also enters into a relationship with Nolan. Scarlet alludes to Peter Pan, specifically from Peter Pan in Scarlet. His outfit is an allusion to G-Dragon of Big Bang.
 Sage Ayana Voiced by: Josh Ornelas: A green-haired and dark-skinned young man with tattoos and a long coat, and wields Pilgrim, a large sword with Roman numerals on it. In Before the Dawn, he, like Scarlet, is frustrated with Sun going off on his own, resulting in him giving his leader the silent treatment. During Shade Academy's re-initiation, he is made leader of Team SSEA, though is not a good team leader according to Scarlet. Sage alludes to one of the fables by Aesop, though the exact character and tale are unknown. It is believed that he is based on The Pilgrim and the Sword. His outfit is an allusion to Taeyang of BigBang.
 Neptune Vasilias Voiced by: Kerry Shawcross / Yoshiki Nakajima: A blue-haired man with goggles who has a large rifle that fires electricity and can turn into a guandao and Trident named Tri-Hard (as per Sun's suggestion). Although he has a cool image, he is unable to dance, which is a source of embarrassment for him, and has an intense fear of water. His fear of water comes from an accident as a child involving his water controlling Semblance, "Water Attraction", in which he nearly drowned himself and his older brother, Jupiter. Neptune alludes to the Roman sea god of the same name. His appearance and outfit is styled after BigBang member T.O.P.

Team ABRN
Team ABRN (pronounced "auburn") fights Team RWBY in the team round of the Vytal Festival Tournament. Its members are among the group of students that fights off Grimm and Atlas mechs during the Battle of Beacon. In Before the Dawn, they have transferred to Shade Academy following Lionheart's death.	
 Arslan Altan Voiced by: Ami Naito: A dark-skinned young woman who is capable of hand-to-hand combat and wields a rope javelin.	
 Bolin Hori Voiced by: Jon Risinger / Ryōsuke Morita: A black-haired young man who wields a staff.	
 Reese Chloris Voiced by: Erin Winn / Chisato Mori: A light green-haired girl who rides a hoverboard that absorbs Dust crystals and transforms into dual pistols.	
 Nadir Shiko Voiced by: Eiji Takeuchi: A pink-haired teenage boy who wields an assault rifle that can also transform into a sword.

Team SAFR 
Team SAFR (pronounced "sapphire") are the main protagonists of RWBY: The Grimm Campaign. Two years prior to the events of the main series, the team was assigned by Qrow Branwen to investigate the rise of Grimm and criminal organizations in the Mistral city of Kuchinashi.
 Arrastra Skye Voiced by: Laura Yates: A blue-haired Faunus with cat legs. Her weapon, Windlass, is a large pickaxe which can convert into a crossbow form. Her Semblance, "Equilibrium", allows her to restore the Aura of a willing ally through Dust, though the receiver will suffer from side effects.
 Asher Mora Voiced by: Chad James: A grey-haired man who wields Fortune's Fangs, a hawkbill knife and hook that can extend into a glaive. His Semblance, "Flash", allows him to release a bright light from his body that blinds others within the vicinity and damages Grimm.
 Fenix Nemean Voiced by: Chris Kokkinos: A red-haired Faunus with a lion's mane. his weapon, Pandora's Aegis, is a pair of bronze, arm-mounted brass claws which can convert into arm-mounted shields. His Semblance, "Beast Mode", turns him berserk and increases his physical capabilities, but can be reverted through various ways.
 Pyke Rite Voiced by:Kerry Shawcross: A brown-haired man who wields Rasen, a drill cannon mounted on his right hand. His Semblance, "Fate's Hand", has him ask fate for the best way to handle a situation, and hoping for the best. Sometimes it improves outcomes, but other times it can make outcomes worse.

Arc Family
  Jaune's ancestor who fought in the Great War, and the original wielder of Crocea Mors.	
  Voiced by: Lindsay Sheppard: Jaune's elder sister who is currently living in Argus with her wife Terra and their son Adrian. She is the only daughter of the family to have moved out. She helps her brother's group by having Adrian distract the military base with his cries. She is based on Sappho of Lesbos.		
  Voiced by: Jamie Smith: Saphron's wife and Adrian's mother. She works as a technician at the city of Argus' relay tower, though she has been falsely blamed for technical troubles. Terra guides Blake on how to disable the tower's radar when the group tries to steal an airship.	
  Voiced by: Lucella Wren Clary: Saphron and Terra's son, and Jaune's nephew. His cries are capable of delivering powerful sound waves.

Others
  and  Voiced by: Kaiji Tang / Yoji Ueda and Dawn M. Bennett / Azusa Tanaka: The late parents of Lie Ren. They lived in Kuroyuri with their son, and Li was an archer. They were both killed when Grimm destroyed the town.

Shade Academy/Vacuo
 Professor Theodore The headmaster of Shade Academy who is mentioned in the novel RWBY: After the Fall. He is a genderbent allusion to Dorothy from the Wizard of Oz.
 Professor Xanthe Rumpole The history teacher of Shade Academy and Theodore's right-hand woman. Her Semblance allows her to touch any non-living object and turn it to gold in an instant. In Before the Dawn, Rumpole secretly allows Team CFVY to investigate The Crown. She is an allusion to Rumpelstiltsken.

Team BRNZ
Team BRNZ (pronounced "bronze") fights Team JNPR in the first (team) round of the Vytal Festival Tournament. In Before the Dawn, it's revealed that almost all of the team was killed in the Fall of Beacon, with Nolan being the sole survivor.
 Brawnz Ni Voiced by: Blaine Gibson / Ryuichi Kijima: A black-haired man with gray highlights who wields a pair of claws.
 Roy Stallion Voiced by: Atsushi Miyamoto: A dark-skinned male with dreadlocks who wears gauntlets capable of firing circular saws. He was carried off by a Nevermore during the Battle of Beacon, and his death was later confirmed in After the Fall. 
 Nolan Porfirio Voiced by: Aaron Marquis: A maroon-haired man who wields an electrically charged cattle prod. In Before the Dawn, it was revealed he had romantic feelings for Roy, and later entered into a relationship with Scarlet. He is intended as the "Lost Boy" to Scarlet's Peter Pan.  
 May Zedong A beanie-wearing female who wields a sniper rifle with a blade on the underside of the stock.

Team NDGO
Team NDGO (pronounced "indigo") fights Team SSSN in the first (team) round of the Vytal Festival Tournament.  The characters are based on fans who were Indiegogo backers for the movie Lazer Team. In Before the Dawn, they act the most antagonistic towards the other transfer student teams from Beacon and Haven.
 Nebula Violette Voiced by: Kate Warner: A purple-haired girl who wields a crossbow that can transform into a sword.
 Dew Gayl Voiced by: Kim Newman / Chisato Mori: A blonde-haired girl who wields a spear capable of creating tornadoes.
 Gwen Darcy Voiced by: Mylissa Zelechowski / Konomi Fujimura: A black-haired girl who wields throwing knives that she keeps in her armored skirt.
 Octavia Ember Voiced by: Claire Hogan: A red-haired girl who wields a kris sword that can release fire torrents. Her Semblance is called "Sand Skating", which allows her to traverse sandy environments at high speeds.

Temporary Teams
In Before the Dawn, Theodore forms temporary teams that are mixes of Shade, Beacon, and Haven academy students.
 Team BYRN (pronounced "burn"): Bolin Hori, Yatsuhashi Daichi, Rae Noire, and Neptune Vasilias
 Team FNDU (pronounced "fondue"): Fox Alistair, Nolan Porfirio, Dew Gayl, and Umber Gorgoneion
 Team NOVA ("nova"): Nebula Violette, Octavia Ember, Velvet Scarlatina, and Arslan Altan
 Team ROSC (pronounced "rosy"): Reese Chloris, Olive Gashley, Scarlet David, and Coco Adel
 Team SSEA (pronounced "sea"): Sage Ayana, Sun Wukong, Elektra Fury, and Ariadne Guimet

Others
Starr Sanzang Sun's elder cousin who lives in Vacuo. She runs a dojo. She witnessed Sun unlocking his Semblance when he was younger.

Menagerie Nation
  Voiced by: Kent Williams / Masafumi Kimura: Blake's father, and chieftain of Menagerie. His Faunus trait is his retractable panther claws at his fingertips. He originally served as leader of the White Fang before stepping down. Tall and imposing, Ghira loves and cares about Blake immensely, and is highly protective of her. He also has a hard time liking Sun, unlike his wife. In the Volume 5 finale, after successfully defending Haven, Ghira decides to form a new brotherhood of Faunus who want to create a better future. Ghira's name could possibly be derived from Bagheera, a black panther from the classic story The Jungle Book.
  Voiced by: Tara Platt / Megumi Toyoguchi Ghira's wife and Blake's mother. Like her daughter, Kali has black Faunus cat ears. Upon meeting Sun, she takes a liking to him and quickly bonds with him. In Volume 5, Kali defends her home from White Fang insurgents and later leads the Mistral police in the Battle of Haven. Kali is named after the Hindu goddess, and the name is Sanskrit for black.
   Voiced by: Cherami Leigh / Mariya Ise: A chameleon Faunus who is an old acquaintance of Blake's, able to change her skin tone and eye color at will. She wields Lightning Lash, a rapier-like weapon that doubles as a whip that can give off an electrical charge. Before joining the White Fang, Ilia lived in the mining community in Mantle with her parents enrolling her in an Atlas prep school. While Ilia's abilities allowed her to perfectly blend in with the humans, she lost control of them when she attacked her schoolmates in a fit of rage upon hearing them snicker about a mining accident that killed her parents. In Volume 4, Ilia spies on the Belladonna household before being forced to elude Blake and Sun. In Volume 5, it is revealed that she had romantic feelings for Blake. Angered by Blake's crush on Adam, Ilia carries out an order by the Albain brothers to subdue Blake while her associates assassinate Ghira and Kali. After Blake escapes, however, Ilia fights her at the Belladonna home where Blake convinces her to leave the White Fang and help defend Haven. In the Battle of Haven, Ilia prevents Adam from destroying the school by disarming his explosives. In Volume 6, Ilia parts ways with Blake by remaining in Mistral to help Ghira with his new Faunus movement.  She is the first confirmed non-heterosexual character to appear in the series. Ilia is believed to allude to Kaa from The Jungle Book.

Maidens
Maidens are women who are capable of wielding great magic, including control over the weather and natural elements, as well as being the only ones to access one of the four Relics each.  The original Four Maidens, each named after the four seasons, were given their powers by Ozpin in one of his past lives with their magic transferred into the body of another woman. 

Fall Maidens
  Voiced by: Laura Bailey / Ayako Kawasumi: The previous Fall Maiden who is a skilled combatant armed with a staff with Dust crystals on each end and is capable of hand-to-hand combat, ending up in a comatose state when attacked by Cinder who siphoned half of her power. Her body was placed in an Atlas-made life support device in the Vault under Beacon Academy, Ozpin and the others resolving to risky gambit to transfer Amber's remaining powers and soul into a willing Pyrrha.  But Amber is killed by Cinder as the process commenced. 
 

Spring Maidens
 

Winter Maidens
  Voiced by: Luci Christian: The previous Winter Maiden. In Volume 7, she is on life support at an Atlesian medical facility, with Winter Schnee chosen as her successor. Fria is visited only by Winter, to ensure that the Maiden will only think of the operative at her death, so that she will transfer her powers to her chosen successor. It is implied that Fria is into painting, but she frequently suffers from seizures in her left arm.  Fria eventually dies during Cinder's attack, only for the power to be passed to Penny instead of Winter.  Fria alludes to the character Blue Fairy from the tale Pinocchio.

Deities and Relic Beings
Two deity brothers who were initially at odds with each other before they created humanity together on the foundation of creation, destruction, knowledge and choice. When Salem tried to have them resurrect Ozma, the brothers curse her with immortality as punishment. When she led a human rebellion against the brothers, the God of Darkness destroys all of humanity except for Salem, and the brothers left Remnant while leaving behind the four Relics as a beacon to summon them to judge the new race of humans that came to be in their absence.

Deities
  Voiced by: Chase McCaskill: The eldest deity brother, the first to refuse Salem's request to resurrect Ozma as it would disrupt natural order and cursed her with immortality after she used his brother to commit the deed. Following his brother wiping out the human rebellion, the God of Light grants Ozma the ability to reincarnate to stop Salem while creating the four Relics as a means to summon him and his brother back to Remnant. After seeing Jinn's vision, Maria deduces that the power of the silver-eyed warriors comes from the God of Light.
  Voiced by: Bruce DuBose: The younger of the deity brothers who both created the Grimm and granted magic to humans. When he resurrects Ozma at Salem's behest before learning he was her second choice following a brief fight with the God of Light, the God of Darkness joins his brother in cursing Salem and later wipes out of most of humanity when Salem turned them on the brothers. When he leaves Remnant with his brother, the God of Darkness shatters the moon in the process.

Relic Beings
  Voiced by: Colleen Clinkenbeard: The being within the Relic of Knowledge, summoned by whoever says her name while holding it, freezing time for her and her summoner during that duration. Jinn can answer three questions once a century, only able to answer events that had or are occurring as a manifestation of knowledge. Ruby summons Jinn in Volume 6 to learn the truth about Ozpin, the being granting her request by revealing to Team RWBY, Qrow, Oscar and Maria how Ozpin and Salem transcended their humanity. When later summoned by Ruby during the battle against the Leviathan with no question, Jinn warns her that she would not exploit her ability to freeze time again.
  Voiced by: Valentine Stokes: The being within the Relic of Creation that has an energetic and playful personality. Like Jinn, he stops time for him and whoever summons him. Ambrosius has the power to create anything his summoner wishes, though his power has certain limits. He can make only one creation at a time, and when he creates something else, his previous creation ceases to exist. He also needs blueprints to know what exactly he is going to create, and cannot bring the dead back to life and use his powers to destroy. He is conjecturally believed to allude to Merlin.

Ever After
The Ever After is an alternate world where Team RWBY, Jaune, and Neo have fallen into during the events of Volume 9. It is heavily inspired by Alice in Wonderland. In-universe, it serves as the setting for the fairy tale, The Girl Who Fell Through the World.
  Voiced by: Luci Christian: A mouse Ruby encounters when she first enters the Ever After. They then join Team RWBY as their guide. Alludes to the Dormouse and Stuart Little.
  Voiced by: Robbie Daymond: A purple and blue mosaic-patterned cat that can split its body parts. Alludes to the Cheshire Cat.
  Voiced by: Christopher Guerrero: A caterpillar-like individual who lives in the mushroom-like acre of the Ever After. Using incense, they have Team RWBY confront past versions of themselves. Alludes to the Caterpillar.

Antagonists

Salem's Inner Circle

Salem 

 Voiced by: Jen Taylor, Natalie Van Sistine (Paladins: Champions of the  Realm)/ Kikuko Inoue
 
The main antagonist of the series who, prior to her formal introduction in the season three finale, was known as Mysterious Narrator, providing the origins of Remnant and Dust, along with narration for the first World of Remnant shorts. Volume 6 would reveal she was originally human before her attempt to save Ozma cursed her with immortality by the gods, causing the near extinction of humanity in rallying them against the deities, and her attempt of drowning herself in a Grimm Pit mutated her into a human-Grimm hybrid. When Ozma was given the ability to reincarnate, Salem ends up in eternal conflict with her reincarnated lover over how best to guide the surviving humans while resolved to divide and rob them of their hope. Her ultimate goal is her own death, by summoning the gods back to Remnant with the Relics and have them kill all of the unworthy humanity, herself included. However, she does not disclose her goal to her subordinates. Salem also claims to be responsible for Summer's death, which is a constant source of sorrow for Ruby 

Her name is based on the town of Salem, Massachusetts, known for its witch trials and alludes to the Wicked Witch from The Wonderful Wizard of Oz.

Cinder Fall 

 Voiced by: Jessica Nigri / Yūko Kaida

A mysterious woman who possesses magma-based powers in creating various type of weapons: these include Midnight – a pair of blades that combine to form a bow that she uses to fire arrows – as well as a variety of weapons she creates using her Fall Maiden powers. Cinder's Semblance, "Scorching Caress", allows her to heat objects and manipulate their shape. She also fights with glass and has been noted to have fused Dust into some of her clothing. Cinder is a very cunning and secretive woman, with goals of gaining power and becoming feared by others, and the end goal of overthrowing Ozpin, as per her superior Salem's wishes.  However, in Volume 8, Cinder declares that she serves no one, as she only wants the powers of the Maidens. After Watts berates her for her ego, self-entitlement and past failures, Cinder becomes more cunning and ruthless as she later betrays him and Neo to accomplish her goals.

Originally an orphan from Mistral, Cinder was adopted and brought to Atlas but is forced to become a slave at the Glass Unicorn hotel by her stepmother. There, she is constantly abused and tortured by her stepfamily. One night, Cinder steals a sword from Rhodes, who pities her and decides to train her in secret to become a Huntress. Years later, when her stepsisters discover her sword, Cinder mercilessly kills her entire stepfamily, and later Rhodes when he turns on her. The years of abuse take their toll on Cinder, molding her into a sadistic woman craving for power.

In Volume 3, as she launches the Battle of Beacon, Cinder kills Amber to claim her power, and then Ozpin and Pyrrha, the latter's death resulting in Cinder being exposed to Ruby' s hidden powers manifesting. Volume 4 reveals that Cinder lost her left eye and arm, the arm replaced with a Grimm limb grafted onto her body, and is initially forced to have Emerald speak for her until she regains her speech. After going through Salem's treatment, Cinder proceeds to master her new powers. 

Cinder is an allusion to Cinderella.

Dr. Arthur Watts 

 Voiced by: Christopher Sabat / Tōru Ōkawa

A doctor who is formal yet arrogant and condescending to his allies. His main weapon is a twenty-bullet revolver while using his rings to both hack into networks, and use hard-light Dust as a shield.  Watts once served as a scientist in Atlas alongside Pietro and is an old acquaintance of Jacques, faking his death during the Paladin project.

While mostly taking a backseat during the Haven arc, Watts later heads for Atlas with Tyrian under Salem's orders, where he hacks into Mantle's security to avoid detection. In Volume 7, Watts offers his services to Jacques by rigging the votes while destroying Ironwood's reputation with doctored footage, using the businessman to access Altas's systems and disable the heating during a snowstorm so the resulting negativity would instigate the Grimm to attack Mantle.  He was defeated and arrested by Ironwood. In Volume 8, seemingly under Ironwood's order, Watts hacks into Penny using one of her swords stolen by the Ace-Ops. He then steals the general's scroll to contact Salem about the Winter Maiden.  During the Battle of Atlas, Watts is freed by Cinder and later takes down the CCT to cut off Jaune's warning, releases Ironwood from prison, and autopilots the ship carrying Ironwoood's bomb to Mantle. But he is then betrayed by Cinder who traps him in the control room and dies in the fall of Atlas.

Watts alludes to John Watson from Sherlock Holmes.

Tyrian Callows 

 Voiced by: Josh Grelle (Volumes 4–8) / Yoku Shioya

A pale psychopathic scorpion Faunus with a long, black braided ponytail and yellow eyes that turn purple while striking with his stinger, showing himself to be extremely devoted to Salem. He wields The Queen's Servants, which are a pair of wrist-mounted blades with gun barrels. His Semblance allows him to channel his Aura at his hand and slice through another's Aura to cause severe damage. Tyrian was a serial killer in Anima who escaped capture when the prison cargo ship carrying him was attacked by Grimm and he joined Salem afterward. In Volume 4 Tyrian is assigned by Salem to find and capture Ruby. However, while catching up to Team RNJR, Tyrian is forced to retreat after Ruby cut off his tail when he poisoned Qrow. In Volume 6, Tyrian is outfitted with a new bionic tail developed by Watts and accompanies the scientist to Atlas. Near the end of Volume 7, Tyrian kills Clover with Qrow's weapon.

Tyrian alludes to the scorpion from The Scorpion and the Frog while named after a shade of purple.

Hazel Reinart 

 Voiced by: William Orendorff / Akio Ōtsuka

A muscular man who is normally reserved and composed with his Semblance, "Numbing Agent", serving as a form of painkiller whenever he embeds raw Dust crystals into his body to augment his strength. Hazel joined Salem as he blamed Ozpin for the death of his sister Gretchen during a training mission while she attended Beacon, his calm exterior replaced with rage when in Ozpin's presence. He reveals to Oscar that he has tried to kill the witch multiple times, only to fail and eventually join her inner circle in the hope of creating a new world. In Volume 8, Hazel brutally tortures Oscar on how to activate the Relic of Knowledge. But after he learns of Salem's true goal and sees Jinn emerge from the Relic, Hazel turns on his master and fights her in Gretchen's memory. He later sacrifices himself by restraining Salem so that Oscar can hit the witch with most of the power stored in the Lost Memory.

Hazel and Gretchen's names come from Hansel and Gretel.

Mercury Black 

 Voiced by: J.J. Castillo (Volume 2), Yuri Lowenthal (Volume 3–present) / Hikaru Midorikawa

A gray-haired associate of Cinder's who uses a pair of greaves, Talaria, that also function as guns. His legs are mechanical prosthetics which were implied to be surgically attached because of damage caused to his natural legs by his father, Marcus.  Mercury unlocked his Semblance before it was stolen by Marcus, and was not able to get it back after training.  In Volume 8, Mercury is promoted to Salem's inner circle and is no longer Cinder's subordinate.

He alludes to the Roman god of the same name.

Tock
 Voiced by: Ruth Urquhart

A crocodile Faunus from Maria's younger days as the Grimm Reaper, armed with a pair of saber swords, a set of sharp metal implanted teeth and possessing a Semblance that makes her nigh invulnerable for one minute at a time. Tock was sent by Salem to assassinate Maria and steal her silver eyes, managing to blind Maria before being killed by her. 

Tock is an allusion to the Crocodile from Peter Pan.

Leonardo Lionheart

 Voiced by: Daman Mills

A lion Faunus with a tail who was the headmaster of Haven Academy, armed with wrist-mounted shield named Stalwart that fires combined Dust projectiles. While originally a member of Ozpin's inner circle, Lionheart betrayed them as he allied himself with Salem's faction. Volume 5 confirmed that Lionheart's reasons of working for Salem were out of fear, having given her the names of numerous Hunters that were killed off in secret and helping set up an ambush for Qrow and the Beacon students during the Battle of Haven. When the tide turns against Salem's faction, Lionheart tries to run away but is killed by Salem's Seer Grimm.

He is based on the Cowardly Lion in The Wonderful Wizard of Oz.

Cinder's faction

Cinder Fall
Cinder Fall

Roman Torchwick 

 Voiced by: Gray G. Haddock (Volumes 1–3, Chibi), Chris Wehkamp (Ice Queendom) / Shinichiro Miki
 
An orange-haired criminal whom Ruby fights in the series' first episode, armed with the Melodic Cudgel, a cane which doubles as a firearm and grappling gun. Throughout the first two Volumes, Roman aids Cinder's plans in numerous Dust robberies and enlisting the White Fang to cause public unrest until he was arrested by the authorities in the Volume 2 finale. But this would later to be part of Cinder's plan, as Neo frees him and they take control of an Atlas ship during the Fall of Beacon. However, Roman ends up being devoured by a Griffon that he unknowingly attracted with his nihilism while overpowering Ruby. From Volume 6 onwards, Roman's hat is worn by Neo.

His attire is inspired by the lead character Alex from the novel/film A Clockwork Orange, while his name is primarily an allusion to Candlewick or Lampwick from Pinocchio.

Neopolitan 
 Voiced by: Casey Lee Williams / Konomi Fujimura

Born Trivia Vanille and often nicknamed "Neo", she is an associate of Roman's with heterochromic eyes that change color between pink, brown, and white depending on her mood, while her hair is pink and brown with streaks of white. Neo has an parasol called Hush, which is capable of blocking powerful blasts with a hidden blade in its handle. Her illusion-based Semblance, "Overactive Imagination", has a variety of uses, from physical illusions to disguises for herself. In Volume 9, Neo subconsciously evolves her Semblance when she creates clones of herself to defeat the Jabberwalker. Though she is mute, Neo continuously smiles as a way of taunting her opponents. In RWBY Chibi, Neo communicates through signs, a la Wile E. Coyote. In Volume 3, Neo was assumed dead when knocked into a Grifon horde by Ruby, while on an airship during the Battle of Beacon. She resurfaces in Mistral and joins Cinder's cause after attempting to kill her, when Cinder promises her the honor of killing Ruby, whom they both hate. Having lost Roman Torchwick, her only friend, she dons his bowler hat in memory of him. In Volume 8, having enough of waiting for her revenge, Neo steals the Relic of Knowledge from Salem to make a demand on Cinder for Ruby in exchange for the Relic and information on how to unlock it. In the passageways to Vacuo, Neo knocks Yang into the void after her plan to kill Ruby is thwarted. She is then betrayed by Cinder and is knocked herself into the void by the Fall Maiden. 

Neo's name and appearance both reference neapolitan ice cream. According to E.C. Myers, Neo's birth name is a reference to the ancient Greek deity Hecate, though he is unsure of who or what the character is actually intended to allude to.

In BlazBlue: Cross Tag Battle, Neo's name is incorrectly spelled "Neo Politan".

White Fang 
The White Fang is an organization composed of persecuted Faunus fighting for civil rights like those committed by the Schnee Dust Company using their people for labor, originally established by Ghira Belladonna as a peaceful civil disobedience group. But when he stepped down five years prior to the beginning of the series and is succeeded by Sienna Khan, the White Fang became a terrorist cell under the gradual influence of Adam Taurus who staged a coup before the organization became fragmented in the aftermath of the Battle of Haven.
Adam Taurus Voiced by: Garrett Hunter/ Yūichi Nakamura: A red-haired man with bull horns and Blake's former mentor-turned-archenemy, in the "Black" trailer, revealed in Volume 4 as the leader of a White Fang splinter group based in Vale. He wears a mask to conceal his SDC brand and scar over his left eye. He wields a chokutō and a gun called Wilt and Blush, respectively. Blush doubles as Wilt's sheath, and Adam can shoot Wilt out from the gun as a projectile. His Semblance is "Moonslice", which enables him to absorb attacks with Wilt and strike back with countered force. While a mentor figure to Blake, who considered him a hero for Faunus rights like most of the White Fang, Adam gradually became an extremist who considers his people as superior to humans. When Blake left the White Fang when Adam showed a complete disregard for the crew of a train they attacked in the "Black" trailer, Adam became obsessed with making her pay for her betrayal. Adam leads the White Fang during the Fall of Beacon in the climax of Volume 3 and overpowers Blake, slicing Yang's right arm off to make good on his promise. In Volume 5, after murdering Sienna during an arranged meeting between her and Hazel, Adam leads the White Fang during the Battle of Haven. But his attack is thwarted by Blake, and the White Fang falling into disarray when he abandons his subordinates to escape. In Volume 6, Adam kills his own army after losing their support. At Argus, Adam sees Blake and Yang once again and gleefully attempts to kill them both in order to execute his final act of revenge, but they stand against, overpower, and finally kill him.  RWBY: the Official Companion confirms that Adams based on Gaston from the Beauty and the Beast Disney animated film.
White Fang Lieutenant Voiced by: Gray G. Haddock / Kenji Nomura: A higher-ranking White Fang member under Adam who works with Roman Torchwick during Volume 2, armed with a chainsaw-like sword which he uses during his battle against Weiss on the train towards Vale. After winning the fight, Blake intervenes to rescue her and escape. What happened to him after the train crash is unknown.
Sienna Khan Voiced by: Monica Rial: The former High Leader of the White Fang who has tiger ears, succeeding Ghira after he stepped down. Her weapon is Cerberus Whip, a chain whip with three detachable Dust blades. Her Semblance, "Grudge", makes her stronger, faster and more vicious when her foes' Auras are weakened and broken. Khan firmly believes in using fear and violence to end the humans' prejudice towards the Faunus, but denounces any unnecessary actions that would justify the prejudice as Adam had done during the Fall of Beacon. Adam later arranges a meeting between Sienna and Hazel for the latter to see if the White Fang can be of service to Salem. But Sienna is instead killed by Adam in a coup, with her death fabricated so she would be a martyr for the White Fang's cause. Sienna alludes to Shere Khan from The Jungle Book.
Corsac and Fennec Albain Voiced by: Derek Mears and Mike McFarland: Fox Faunus brothers who represent the White Fang in Menagerie. Corsac is taller with a gray fox tail, and Fennec is shorter with light brown fox ears. They each wield a Dust-powered sai, collectively called Cyclone and Inferno.  They secretly work for Adam, though they have become uneasy with his leadership because of his obsession with Blake's suffering. The brothers personally lead the White Fang during the assault on the Belladonna household in an attempt to kill Ghira and Kali, ending with Fennec's death while Corsac is arrested.

Atlas

James Ironwood

 Voiced by: Jason Rose / Masaki Terasoma

Headmaster of Atlas Academy and a renowned military leader, also being a member of Ozpin's inner circle despite disagreeing with him over using military force to handle threats head-on. According to Glynda, he tends to take his work with him wherever he goes. His weapons, collectively called Due Process, are a pair of revolvers that can be attacked to a cannon. His Semblance, "Mettle", enables him to hyper-focus and carry through with whatever decision he makes. In Volume 3, it is revealed that Ironwood has a robotic right arm, torso and leg.

In his debut in Volume 2, Ironwood brings his military forces, which puts him at odds with Ozpin immediately. In Volume 4, Ironwood puts an embargo on Dust exportation and then closing off Atlas's borders to prevent another war. By Volume 7, Ironwood plans to restore global communications by turning Amity Colosseum into a CCT tower, and to reveal Salem's existence to the world, which is why he called all of Atlas back to the kingdom to fight the Grimm that will flock to them when panic breaks out. But with Watts and Tyrian causing chaos in Mantle, Ironwood slowly descends into paranoia and starts to make irrational decisions, including the order for Robyn's arrest for stealing supplies for Amity. He is able to regain his composure long enough to reveal Salem's existence to the council, order the evacuation of Mantle, and lure and defeat Watts in Amity. But Ironwood's paranoia returns when Salem demands for the Relics, prompting him to abandon Mantle and move Atlas out of Salem's reach, while ordering the arrest of Teams RWBY and JNR, Qrow and Oscar when their lies and treachery are revealed to him. Ironwood's intolerance of RWBY's actions results in him becoming one of the main antagonists of Volume 8, shooting Councilman Sleet dead and doing everything he can to force Penny to return to Atlas. Though he is initially defeated by Team JNR, Oscar, Emerald and Winter, and locked up in prison, Ironwood escapes, kills Jacques, and overpowers Winter at the vault. But he is later defeated by her when she receives the Maiden powers from Penny. Ironwood is unable to stop Salem from taking the Relics and is left to die in the fall of Atlas.

Ironwood alludes to the Tin Woodman from The Wonderful Wizard of Oz.

Jacques Schnee
 Voiced by: Jason Douglas / Madoka Shiga

The husband of Willow, the father of Weiss, Winter, and Whitley, Weiss's archenemy, and the former head to the Schnee Dust Company. His surname was "Gelée" before he married into the Schnee family, priding himself in maintaining the family's good name at any cost. While Jacques brought great success to the SDC after convinced his father-in-law Nicholas to let him take over the company, some of the practices he established to maintain the SDC have been considered controversial. The actions of the White Fang stating attacks on SDC over poor labor practices involving Faunus employees gradually plays a part in Jacques's strained relation with Weiss, with their family irreparably broken when Jacques admits to Willow that he married her only for the Schnee name during Weiss' tenth birthday.

Jacques is introduced in the Volume 3 finale when he takes Weiss back to Atlas in the aftermath of the Fall of Beacon. In Volume 4, after Weiss causes a commotion during the charity's cocktail party forces Jacques to remove her as his heir and confine her in Schnee manor before she escapes him. In Volume 7, Jacques runs against Robyn for election on the Atlas Council. He is later approached by Watts, who offers his services to rig the election and further destroy Ironwood's public image. But Jacques is stripped of his position and arrested for treason when Weiss presented evidence of his dealings with Watts to the council. He is mostly kept in prison in Volume 8, but is eventually killed by Ironwood near the finale.

Jacques alludes to Jack Frost.

Bram Thornmane
 Voiced by: Yong Yea

Bram Thormane is the main antagonist of the video game, RWBY: Arrowfell. His weapon is a bow that can be split into two daggers. Bram trained under Ironwood to become a member of the Ace-Ops, but was ultimately rejected by the general and harbors a grudge for his former teacher. While introduced as the guardian of a small village in Mantle, Bram worked behind the scenes as the head of a conspiracy to overthrow Ironwood. But he was eventually defeated by Team RWBY in Fort Arrowfell, and was arrested by Ironwood. With the fall of Atlas, Bram's fate is currently unknown.

Branwen Tribe

Raven Branwen 

 Voiced by: Anna Hullum / Megumi Hayashibara
The former third member of Team STRQ, the mother of Yang, the first lover of Taiyang, Qrow's older twin sister and leader of the Branwen Tribe who follows a survival of the fittest philosophy. Raven is armed with Omen: an ōdachi with interchangeable blades inside the sheath as her weapon of choice with her Semblance, "Kindred Link", allowing her to create a portal to whoever she has a bond with. As revealed in Volume 5, she and Qrow were sent to Beacon to be trained as Hunters to give their people an advantage against hunters. While she initially became a member of Ozpin's inner circle, as he gave her the ability to shapeshift into a raven, Raven questioned Ozpin and resolved to learn the truths of their world on her own, her world-view causing her and Qrow to have a falling out while Taiyang reveals that Raven's flaws were the cause of Team STRQ, and his marriage to her, breaking up as she leaves him sometime after Yang was born. Raven becomes the current Spring Maiden during that time after killing off her predecessor, using Vernal as a decoy to conceal her power.

In Volume 5, after failing to convince Yang to abandon Ruby and join the tribe, Raven allies with Cinder to abtain the Relic of Knowledge in return for Qrow's death while intending to take the Relic for herself to ensure her tribe's survival. During the Battle of Haven, after fighting her brother, Raven proceeds to accompany Cinder and Vernal to the vault and reveals herself as the real Spring Maiden when Cinder impales Vernal. Raven defeats Cinder and opens the vault to the Relic, but is later confronted by Yang who realized her mother's true motivation is that she is afraid of Salem despite her stubbornness to admit it. Raven is ultimately forced to relinquish the Relic to avoid a confrontation with Salem, and tearfully apologizes to Yang as she leaves to see Taiyang in Patch.

Raven alludes to Huginn from Norse mythology.

Others
 Vernal Voiced by: Amber Lee Connors:  Raven's right-hand woman and decoy for the title of the Spring Maiden. Her weapons are a pair of wind and fire wheels with guns attached inside. In her debut in Volume 5, Vernal tells Weiss that the tribe is planning on using her as a ransom for Jacques, and that her older sister has returned to Atlas. Later on during the Battle of Haven, she engages Weiss in combat as per Raven's orders, and easily defeats her. At the vault of the Relic of Knowledge, Vernal is impaled and killed by Cinder for the Maiden's power, only for her to be exposed as a decoy for Raven.
 Shay D. Mann Voiced by: Clifford Chapin: A bandit from Raven's tribe who whom Yang brutally punched at a gas station where he harasses her while drunk, leading her to the camp with the intend to rob her before he and his aid are defeated and learning Yang is Raven's daughter. Later, while guarding the camp gates, he is confronted by Cinder's faction and Watts. His name is a play on the phrase "shady man".

The Crown 
The Crown is an organization based in Vacuo. They serve as the major antagonists in the RWBY novels After the Fall and Before the Dawn.
 Jax Asturias and Gillian Asturias Twin siblings who are the founding leaders of the Crown, seeking to destroy Vacuo's government and restore it to a monarchy under their rule. Jax possesses a mind control Semblance while Gillian's Semblance enables her to augment others with Aura she siphoned from people, the latter's Semblance being the cause of their mother's death at childbirth with Jax being born frail and dependent on his sister. Raised by their father to be xenophobic towards foreigners and believing they were descended from Vacuo's first king Malik the Sunderer, the twins dropped out from Shade Academy along with their teammates Rosa Schwein and Argento Pocoron to establish Crown and form an army of brainwashed super soldiers. But their cope ends in failure, with Gillian turning herself in after being forced by Jax to augment Yatsuhashi's Semblance in placing her brother into a vegetative state. They are an allusion to Jack and Jill.
 Carmine Esclados A veteran Huntress who is the main antagonist of RWBY: After the Fall, armed with sai and possessing a telekinesis Semblance she uses to manipulate her weapons and local weather patterns. She was originally from Atlas before she transferred to Vacuo and graduated Shade Academy, hired alongside her partner Bertilak Celadon by the Asturias twins to traffick people with highly potent Semblances before they are captured by Team CFVY. But the two escape with Carmine placing the blame of their failure on Bertilak, reassigned to hinder Shade Academy's investigations on the Crown and later as Gillian's bodyguard when the Crown makes it move. Carmine sacrificed herself to protect Gillian from a cave-in caused by an explosion, with her fate unknown. She is an allusion to Esclados the Red.

Ever After 
 The Jabberwalker Voiced by: Richard Norman: A purple masked creature that wanders the Ever After. It speaks in single words at a time. It alludes to the Jabberwocky.
 The Red Prince Voiced by: Michael Malconian: Ruler of the Crimson Castle. The Prince was the King in the past who played his games fairly. But after losing to Alyx, he was changed into a prince who cheats to win. Team RWBY encounters him on the day of his birthday, challenging him to a game in exchange for passage to the tree, but he throws a temper tantrum upon losing. He alludes to the Queen of Hearts.

Grimm 
The Grimm, also known as the Creatures of Grimm, are soulless monsters that appear throughout the natural world of Remnant as they are devoid of aura and thrive on the worst aspects of humanity. The Grimm are creations of the God of Darkness that manifest from his domain's Grimm Pits, pools containing a dark substance that kills a non-Grimm being on contact. The Grimm were created for the purpose to destroy everything made by the God of Light, which later includes humans whom both brothers created together. Following the previous version of humanity wiped out by their creator, Grimm instinctively prey on new humans and Faunus races before their discovered of "Dust" with the Huntsmen and Huntresses established to control the creatures' numbers. But Salem, as the result of her attempted suicide in a Grimm Pit, is able to control the Grimm as she orchestrated Beacon's downfall through Cinder Fall to erode enough of the peoples' faith in the Hunters to enable the Grimm to annihilate the city nearly unopposed.

Grimm display no enmity towards normal wildlife; humans and Faunus are the only races attacked on sight. When Grimm die, their corporeal form evaporates, preventing detailed anatomical or biological studies. Grimm in captivity will die, if they are unable to kill their captors or escape, implying that they cannot be kept alive by conventional means. If the theory of Grimm not needing to feed is true, it is entirely possible that they survive on negative emotions as sustenance, or the act of killing in itself. Because they were created by the God of Darkness, Grimm can be fearful around those with silver-eyes whose access to the God of the Light's power can have varying effects on them that include paralysis, petrification, and complete atomization.

Grimm are portrayed as black in color with white masks with yellow markings and red trail-like designs.  The name "Grimm" comes from the pair of brothers who wrote several fairy tales. The vocal sound effects of the Grimm are mostly done by William Orendorff.

 Known species of Grimm
 Beowolf: Grimm creatures who bear resemblance to werewolves that serve as foot soldiers for the stronger Grimm. In the "Red Trailer", the Beowolves appeared without their white masks, looking more like the traditional werewolf, before they were redesigned. There is a larger variant of this species known as an Alpha Beowolf. They are named after the poem Beowulf.
 Geist: Ghost-type Grimm that can possess inanimate objects and turn them into large monsters known as Gigas, indirectly introduced through an Arma Gigas that Weiss defeated in the "White Trailer". The Geist is properly introduced in Volume 4 through a Petra Gigas that Team RNJR defeated. They are named after the spirit.
 Ursa: Bear-like Grimm creatures. The smaller and more common ones are called Ursa Minor, while the larger and more powerful variety are known as Ursa Major. Their name is Latin for bear.
 King Taijitu: Large Amphisbaena-like serpentine Grimms, with a second inverted-colored head where the tail would normally be. In the manga, four King Taijitu were fused into an orochi variant by the Tentacle Grimm.
 Death Stalker: Large scorpion-like Grimm creatures with glowing golden stingers for tails. They are named after the scorpion species.
 Nevermore: Grimm creatures that take the form of a bird, resembling the raven and condor. They come in a variety of sizes. The large ones have the ability to shoot large feathers to pin down enemies or prey. They are named after the catchphrase of the poem The Raven, by Edgar Allan Poe.
 Boarbatusk: Boar-like Grimm creatures with the ability to tuck into a ball and roll in place charging an attack in similar fashion to Sonic the Hedgehog. 
 Goliath: Elephant-like Grimm creatures that can be seen wandering outside Mountain Glenn, most rumored to be centuries old and more intelligent than common Grimm. The variant seen on the Solitas continent is called the Megoliath. According to RWBY: After the Fall, these Grimm attack by flattening their targets. They are named after the Philistine giant Goliath from Abrahamic religions and the word Goliath is now often used to describe something incredibly large and powerful.
 Creep: Non-animal Grimm based on birds and reptiles.
 Griffon: Large winged panther-like creatures with spiked tail, talons, and a white bird's head. Its body resembles a large cat, and it has a spiked tail. They are named after the legendary creature of the same name.
 Wyvern: A dragon Grimm who excretes the dark substance that compromises a Grimm Pit which spawns Grimm. The Wyvern was lying dormant near Mountain Glenn until the events of the Volume 3 finale awakened it for the Fall of Beacon, petrified on top of Beacon Tower when Ruby subconsciously used her silver eyes on it. But the Wyvern still lives while drawing more Grimm to the fallen school.
 Tentacle: A skull-like Grimm exclusive in the manga that can possess organic beings, using that ability to merge other Grimm into a more powerful creature. So far it has only been seen in the manga.
 Ravager: Bat-like Grimm encountered in the deserts of Vacuo.
 Beringel: Gorilla-like Grimm. They are named after the scientific species name of the Eastern gorilla. In the Volume 6 finale, Salem creates an army of winged Beringel, possibly alluding to the flying monkeys of The Wizard of Oz. 
 Sea Feilong: Enormous serpent Grimm that dwell in water and attack with lightning breaths, it has a pair of hidden wings that it can unfurl from its back. It shares the name of the legendary Chinese winged creature, Feilong literally meaning "Flying Dragon".
 Seer: Small, jellyfish-like Grimm that can float in the air, it has long red tentacles tipped with sharp bone-like barbs, two seers can connect over large distances serving as a form of communication between Salem and her agents.
 Nuckelavee: A gigantic Grimm that resembles a demonic humanoid fused to a horse-like creature from the waist down, the monster having destroyed several villages throughout the continent of Anima while being responsible for the total destruction of Ren's village. It attacks with its elastic limbs and ear-piercing scream. In the finale of Volume 4, it is defeated by Team RNJR and slain by a vengeful Ren.
 Lancer: Hornet-like Grimm that can fire their stingers like a harpoon capable of destroying airships. The much larger variety, known as the Queen Lancer, can fire projectiles from its abdomen.
 Manticore: A flying lion-like Grimm that breathes fire and uses it scorpion tail. It is named after the legendary creature from Persian mythology.
 Sphinx: A flying lioness-like Grimm with a serpent for a tail, leading a pack of Manticores to attack a train when they sense the Relic in Team RWBY's possession. It is named after the legendary creature from Greco-Egyptian mythology.
 Apathy: Humanoid Grimm that come in hordes with their ear-piercing shrieks able to drain their humans of their willpower, the ability being fatal if enough Apathy have amassed around a person. One pack of Apathy made their home on Brunswick Farms when the head of the estate captured two members to lessen tension and failed to seal the pack in time, resulting in the death of the entire household in their sleep. Team RWBY and company ended up fighting for their lives when they stumbled onto the nest and manage to survive when Ruby learns to consciously use her silver eyes.
 Leviathan: A giant bipedal crocodilian Grimm the size of a skyscraper capable of breathing fire. It is able to survive being petrified by Ruby's silver eyes before it is killed by Cordovin. It is named after the legendary sea monster of Jewish belief.
 Sabyr: A smilodon-like Grimm that have incredible speed and can jump long distances.
 Centinels: Giant centipede-like Grimm capable of burrowing through the ground.
 Teryx: Raptor-like Grimm with translucent wings.
 Monstra: A whale-like Grimm which serves as a mobile, airborne fortress for Salem. It is destroyed by Oscar during his and Hazel's fight against Salem. The Monstra's name is similar to that of Monstro from Pinocchio.
 Tempest: Giant jellyfish-like Grimm capable of making electrical currents. They serve as personal guards for the Monstra, creating large storm clouds as cover for it when arriving in Atlas.
 The Hound: An unusual Hybrid Grimm which takes the form of a canine, but also can transform into a bipedal creature and can grow wings. It also displays a high level of intelligence, using human shields and is capable of speech. In Volume 8, the Hound captures Oscar and brings him to Salem It later attacks the Schnee manor and nearly captures Penny, but is pushed back by Ruby's power which reveals that this Grimm is a silver-eyed Faunus experimented on by Salem. The Hound is killed by Willow and Whitely who topple a statue on it leaving only the Faunus skeleton behind. Jason Liebrecht provides the vocals for the Hound.
 Cenitaur: A Grimm fusion of a centipede and a centaur. They can spit out green acid stored in their stomach.
 Sulfur Fish: Small Grimm that resemble a silverfish. This was designed by a fan artist who won the Full Sail University and RoosterTeeth Animations Grimm Design contest.
Razorwing: Harpy-like Grimm that serve as enemies in RWBY: Arrowfell.
Nightmare: A Grimm original to Ice Queendom. They appear as seeds that plant themselves in human hosts, trapping them in dreams while draining their Aura.

Other 
 Lil' Miss Malachite Voiced by: Luci Christian: The leader of a Mistral gang whose members have a spider tattoo, possessing a sixth sense that allows her to predict the current whereabouts of others. When approached by Cinder for the location of Ruby and her friends in Volume 6, Malachite withheld the information out of curiosity over who would ask for Cinder. Her hunch is later proven true when hired by Neo. She is also the mother of the twins Melanie and Miltia. She is an allusion of Little Miss Muffet.
 Dr. Merlot Voiced by: Dave Fennoy: The main antagonist of RWBY: Grimm Eclipse, which takes place between Volumes 2 and 3 of the series, a scientist and former colleague of Ozpin before they drifted apart due to Merlot's obsession of understanding the Grimm and improve on their design. Merlot established Merlot Industries in the Mountain Glenn settlement, being the cause of the settlement's failure when he had his subordinates attract Grimm for use in their experiments. But Merlot survived and continued his research on an island where he created mutant variants until Team RWBY's interference forces him to self-destruct his laboratory, his fate currently a mystery. Dr. Merlot is an allusion to Dr. Moreau.
 Madame and Cinder's Stepsisters Voiced by: Linda Leonard and Amanda Lee: The stepfamily of Cinder. The mother was the owner of the Glass Unicorn in Atlas. After adopting Cinder, the mother subjugated her stepdaughter to a life of slavery and allowed her daughters to torment her. Years later, after the daughters discovered Cinder's sword in her room, the whole family is mercilessly killed by her. They allude to the stepfamily of Cinderella.
 Mike and Marty Voiced by: William Ball and Joe Nicolosi: Cinder's Beowolf lackies from "RWBY Chibi".
 Floyd Voiced by: Kerry Shawcross: Cinder's Geist henchman from "RWBY Chibi", having a rivalry with Mike and Marty.

RWBY x Justice League
 Starro The antagonist of the RWBY x Justice League crossover series, an alien creature that arrived on Remnant two decades prior and has gradually been taking over with an interest in powerful Semblances. He is based on Starro the Conqueror from DC Comics.

Works cited notes 
  "Vol." is the shortened form for "Volume" and refers to the DVD volume or season for the series. "Ch." is shortened for "Chapter" and refers to the episode number within the volume, with Vol. 1 having 16 and Vol. 2–4 having 12 chapters. "WoR" refers to "World of Remnant", an encyclopedic series of short videos that reveals more information about the world of RWBY. "WoR" has been incorporated in the RWBY volumes since Volume 2. See List of RWBY episodes for more details.

Explanatory notes

References

External links

 Rooster Teeth official site

Fictional monster hunters